= Hemistylus =

Hemistylus may refer to:

- Hemistylus (bryozoan), an extinct genus of bryozoans in the family Cellariidae
- Hemistylus (plant), a genus of plants in the family Urticaceae
