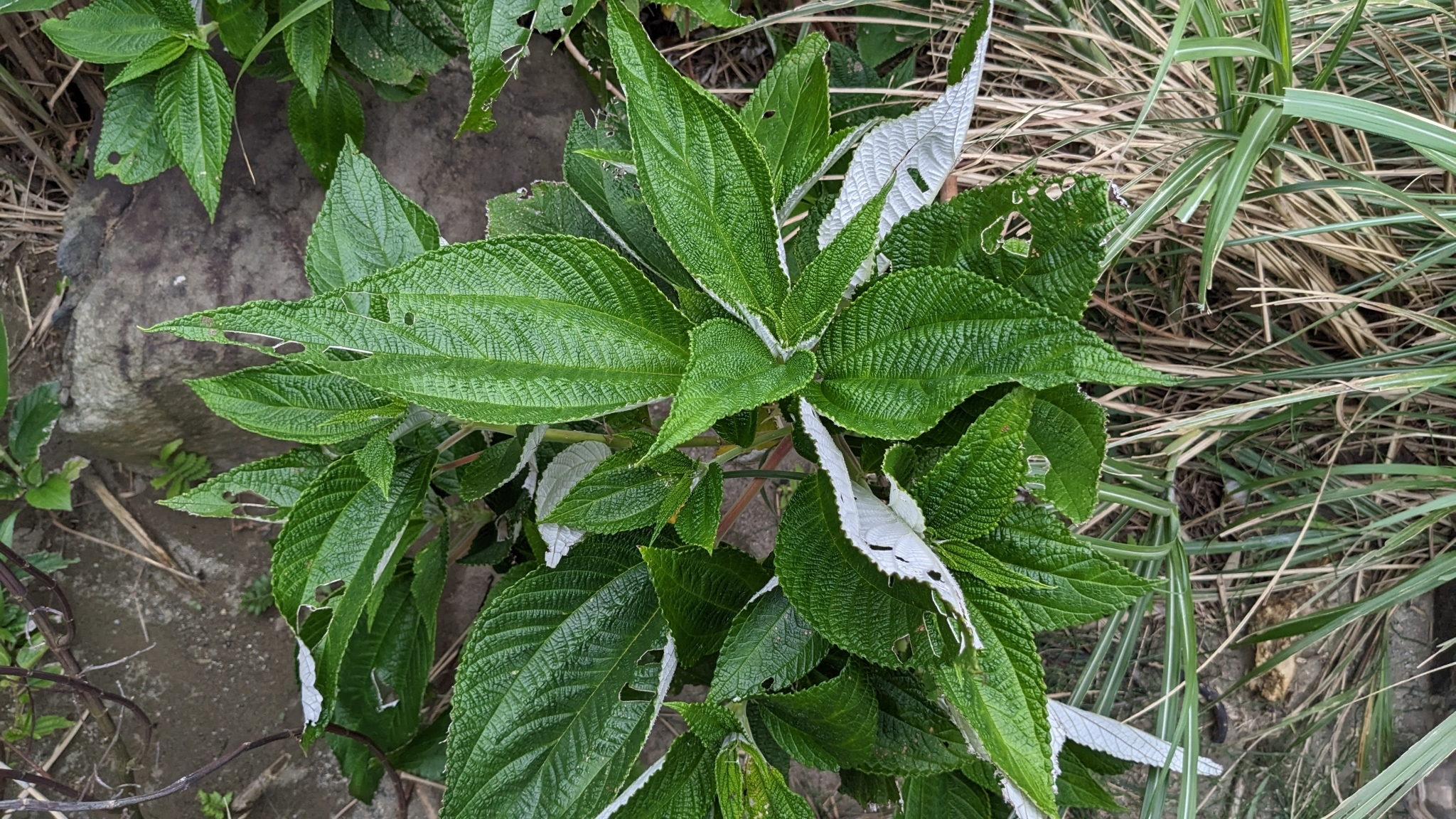
- Maoutia setosa in Taiwan

Scientific classification
- Kingdom: Plantae
- Clade: Embryophytes
- Clade: Tracheophytes
- Clade: Angiosperms
- Clade: Eudicots
- Clade: Rosids
- Order: Rosales
- Family: Urticaceae
- Tribe: Cecropieae
- Genus: Maoutia; Wedd.

Species
- See text

Synonyms
- Lecanocnide Blume, Mus. Bot. 2: t. 12 (1856), nom. nud. Robinsoniodendron Merr., Interpr. Herb. Amboin.: 204 (1917)

= Maoutia =

Genus of shrubs

Maoutia is a genus of shrubs or small trees in the nettle family (Urticaceae).

It is native to Malesia and the South Pacific. It is found in Fiji, Java, Lesser Sunda Islands, Maluku, New Guinea, Philippines, Ryukyu Islands, Samoa, Society Islands, Solomon Islands, Taiwan, Tonga, Vanuatu and Wallis and Futuna Islands.

The genus name of Maoutia is in honour of Emmanuel Le Maout (1799–1877), who was a French naturalist.

== Description ==
The leaves are alternate. The inflorescence branches dichotomously (i.e. it repeatedly divides into two) and the flowers are arranged in small clusters. The pistillate ("female") flowers have very small petals. Maoutia species resemble those of Leucosyke and Debregeasia.

== Species ==
As of September 2022, Plants of the World Online accepted 10 species;

- Maoutia ambigua Wedd.
- Maoutia australis Wedd.
- Maoutia diversifolia (Miq.) Wedd.
- Maoutia gracilis H.J.P.Winkl.
- Maoutia lanceolata Ridl.
- Maoutia odontophylla (Miq.) Miq.
- Maoutia salomonensis Rech.
- Maoutia samoensis Reinecke
- Maoutia setosa Wedd.
- Maoutia warburgii Boerl.
