= Phenax =

Phenax may refer to:

- Phenax, a genus of true bugs in the family Fulgoridae
- Phenax, a genus of plants in the family Urticaceae
