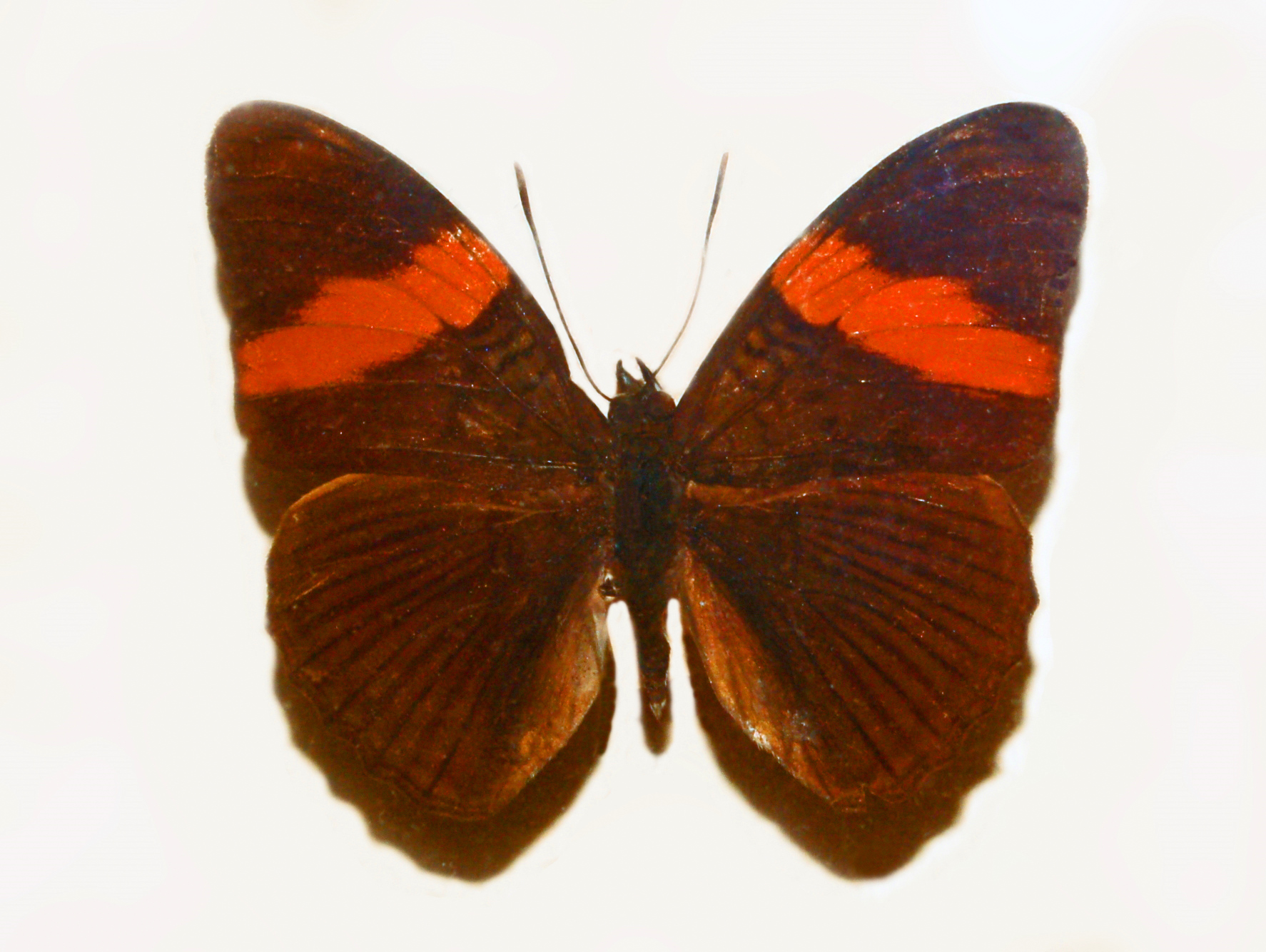
- A. l. lara from Peru

Scientific classification
- Domain: Eukaryota
- Kingdom: Animalia
- Phylum: Arthropoda
- Class: Insecta
- Order: Lepidoptera
- Family: Nymphalidae
- Genus: Adelpha
- Species: A. lycorias

Binomial name
- Adelpha lycorias (Godart, 1824)

Synonyms
- Nymphalis lycorias Godart, 1824; Papilio isis Drury, 1782; Adelpha isis divina Fruhstorfer, 1907; Adelpha isis pseudagrias Fruhstorfer, 1908; Adelpha isis panthalis Martin, [1923]; Heterochroa lara Hewitson, 1850; Adelpha lara mainas Fruhstorfer, 1915; Adelpha lara f. transiens D'Abrera, 1987; Adelpha hypsenor Godman & Salvin, 1879; Adelpha hypsenor f. fassli Fruhstorfer, 1915; Heterochroa melanthe Bates, 1864; Adelpha melanippe Godman & Salvin, [1884]; Heterochroa spruceana Bates, 1864

= Adelpha lycorias =

Pink-banded sister

Species of butterfly

Adelpha lycorias, the pink-banded sister, is a species of butterfly of the family Nymphalidae.

== Description ==
Adelpha lycorias has a wingspan reaching about 50 millimetres (2.0 in). The uppersides of the wings are generally deep brown, with black apex of the anterior wings. The anterior wings are crossed by a broad band of pink or crimson, irregular in its outer margin, commencing on the middle of the costa and ending at the outer margin. The undersides are chocolate colour, while the nervure, the lines between them and the submarginal line are black. The band of the anterior wings is almost white, slightly tinged with crimson.

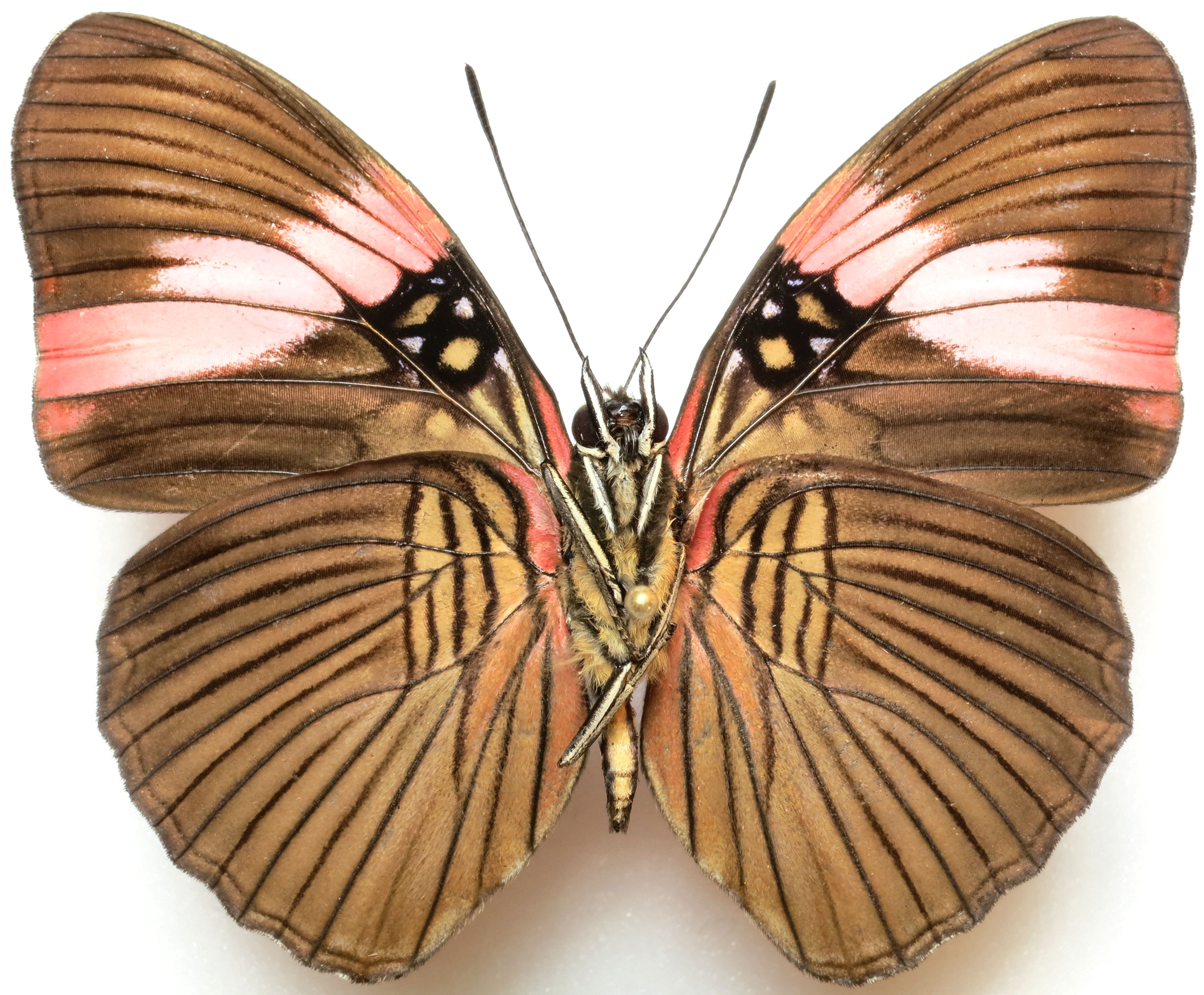
A. l. lara from Tingo María, Huánuco, Peru (ventral view)

Larvae feed on Trema micrantha and on Urera, Myriocarpa and Cecropia species.

== Distribution ==
This species can be found in Mexico, Brazil, Venezuela, Peru, Bolivia, Colombia, Ecuador and Guatemala, usually between 500 and 1800 meters.

== Subspecies ==
- A. l. lycorias (Brazil)
- A. l. lara (Hewitson, 1850) (Venezuela, Peru, Bolivia, Colombia, Ecuador)
- A. l. wallisii (Dewitz, 1877) (Colombia)
- A. l. melanthe (Bates, 1864) (Mexico, Guatemala - Venezuela)
- A. l. melanippe Godman & Salvin, 1884 (Colombia)
