= Nettle tree =

Nettle tree or tree nettle can refer to:

- Celtis

Those names or stinging-nettle tree can also refer to the following plants with stinging hairs:

- Various species of the genus Dendrocnide
- Various species of the genus Obetia
- Urera baccifera
- Urtica ferox

Libythea celtis, the Nettle tree butterfly
