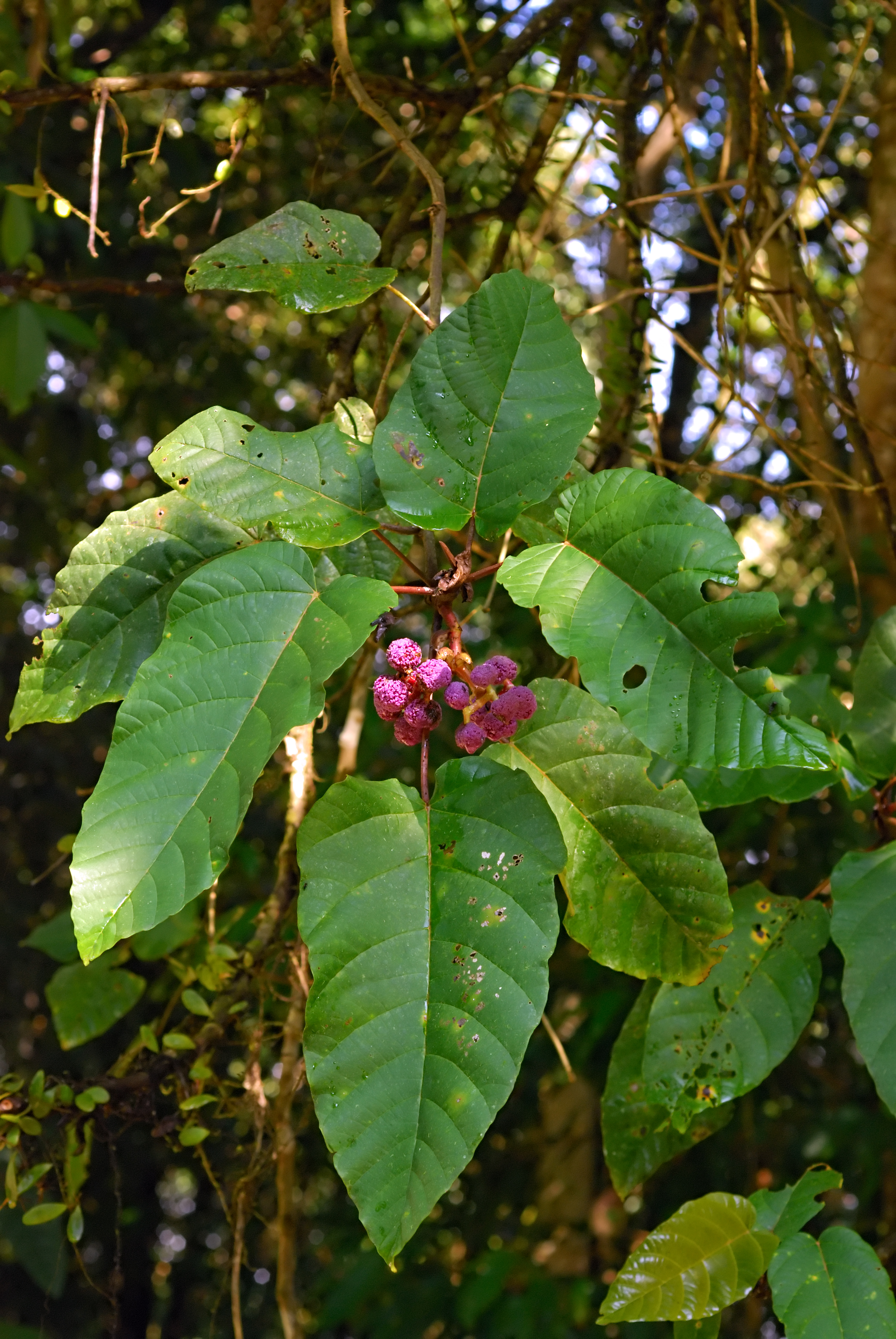
- Poikilospermum suaveolens

Scientific classification
- Kingdom: Plantae
- Clade: Embryophytes
- Clade: Tracheophytes
- Clade: Spermatophytes
- Clade: Angiosperms
- Clade: Eudicots
- Clade: Rosids
- Order: Rosales
- Family: Urticaceae
- Tribe: Urticeae
- Genus: Poikilospermum; Zipp. ex Miq.

Species
- Between 4 & 41, see text

= Poikilospermum =

Family of shrubs

Poikilospermum is a genus of shrubs or tall woody climbers, consisting of at least 33 accepted species. The plants are found from India and China (Yunnan), the Sino-Himalayan region to Sulawesi and Jawa in Indonesia. Some of the plants are used by people.

Common names in the genus include the Chinese 锥头麻属 (zhui tou ma shu) and 陈家瑞 (chen jiarui or chen chia-jui), and the Khmer krâpë rô.

== Classification ==
The classification of the genus was dynamic and the in past was linked to the status of the family Cecropiaceae. At present, consensus places it in the family Urticaceae. One recent phylogenetic study placed it in a clade with Urtica, though two slightly older studies placed it as a sister clade to the Cecropieae (the former Cecropiaceae s. str.) and Urticaeae (Urticaceae s. antiq.). Older, nonphylogenetic, work placed the genus in Cecropiaceae, a family regarded as intermediate between Urticeae and Moraceae

== Taxonomic history ==
Alexander Zippelius (1797-1828) is given authorship of the genus, publishing in Annales Musei Botanici Lugduno-Batavi (Amsterdam), 1: 203, in 1864. His work superseded that of Friedrich Anton Wilhelm Miquel (1811-1871). In 1978, Berg placed it in Cecropiaceae. Most recent work has been by Datwyler & Weiblen (2004), Zerega et al. (2005), and Hadiah et al. (2008) place the genus in Urticaceae.

== Description ==
Members of Poikilospermum are shrubs or tall woody climbers (also known as lianas). The petiolate leaves are alternate; their stipules are often caducous, intrapetiolar, connate, and leathery; their veins are often prominently pinnate; cystoliths occur adaxially in circular groups, abaxially along veins, either punctiform or linear. The inflorescences are solitary and axillary dichotomously branched cymes, they are unisexual (the plants are dioecious). The glomerules are capitate and either on swollen peduncular receptacles (in P. subgen. Ligulistigma, continental Asia group), in agglomerations, or are free (in P. subgen. Poikilospermum, E Malaysia group). The male flowers are with 2-4 perianth lobes, free or slightly connate; there are two to four stamens, the filaments are straight (in P. subgen. Ligulistigma) or inflexed; a rudimentary ovary is present. The female flowers have four perianth lobes, and are clavate-tubular and decussate-imbricate. The ovary in this genus is enclosed, with a short style, a capitate or ligulate (in P. subgen. Ligulistigma) stigma; the ovule is orthotropous. The seeds have little or no endosperm. The cotyledons are ovate.

== Distribution and habitat ==
Plants of the genus occur naturally from India across to Southeast Asia, China and Indonesia. Countries and regions in which plants of the genus grow include: Indonesia (Maluku, Sulawesi, Kalimantan, Jawa, Sumatera); Philippines; Malaysia (Sabah, Sarawak, Peninsular Malaysia); Thailand; Cambodia; Vietnam; Zhōngguó/China (South-central); Laos; Myanmar; India (including Nicobar Islands, Andaman Islands, Assam); Bangladesh; Tibet; East Himalaya. The genus has also been introduced to Jamaica. In China there are 3 species. Species often have high moisture requirement, occurring in Monsoon forests and rain forests, often near streams or other we places, at altitudes ranging from 500m to 1800m. In Cambodia P. suaveolens grows in the undergrowth of dense forests.

== Human use ==
One species is used to produce ties (as in to tie things together).

== Species ==
These species are accepted, as of February 2021:

- Poikilospermum acuminatum (Trécul) Merr.
- Poikilospermum amboinense Zipp. & Miq.
- Poikilospermum amethystinum (H.J.P.Winkl.) Merr.
- Poikilospermum amoenum (King ex Hook.f.) Merr.
- Poikilospermum annamense (Gagnep.) Merr.
- Poikilospermum azureum (Teijsm. & Binn.) Merr.
- Poikilospermum borneense (Miq.) Merr.
- Poikilospermum concolor (Dalzell) M.R.Almeida
- Poikilospermum cordifolium (Barg.-Petr.) Merr.
- Poikilospermum diffusum (Merr.) Merr.
- Poikilospermum dubium (Barg.-Petr.) Merr.
- Poikilospermum erectum (Blanco) Merr.
- Poikilospermum forbesii (S.Moore) Merr.
- Poikilospermum gjellerupii (H.J.P.Winkl.) Merr.
- Poikilospermum grandifolium (Warb.) Merr.
- Poikilospermum hirsutum (H.J.P.Winkl.) Merr.
- Poikilospermum intermedium (Barg.-Petr.) Merr.
- Poikilospermum lanceolatum (Trécul) Merr.
- Poikilospermum longifolium A.C.Church
- Poikilospermum micranthum (Miq.) Merr.
- Poikilospermum microstachys (Barg.-Petr.) Merr.
- Poikilospermum molle (Merr.) Merr.
- Poikilospermum naucleiflorum (Lindl.) Chew
- Poikilospermum nobile (Ridl.) Merr.
- Poikilospermum oblongifolium (Barg.-Petr.) Merr.
- Poikilospermum paxianum (H.J.P.Winkl.) Merr.
- Poikilospermum peltatum (H.J.P.Winkl.) Merr.
- Poikilospermum piperi (Elmer) Merr.
- Poikilospermum scabrinervium (Barg.-Petr.) Merr.
- Poikilospermum scortechinii (King) Merr.
- Poikilospermum suaveolens (Blume) Merr.
- Poikilospermum subscaber (H.J.P.Winkl.) Merr.
- Poikilospermum subtrinervium (Miq.) Chew
