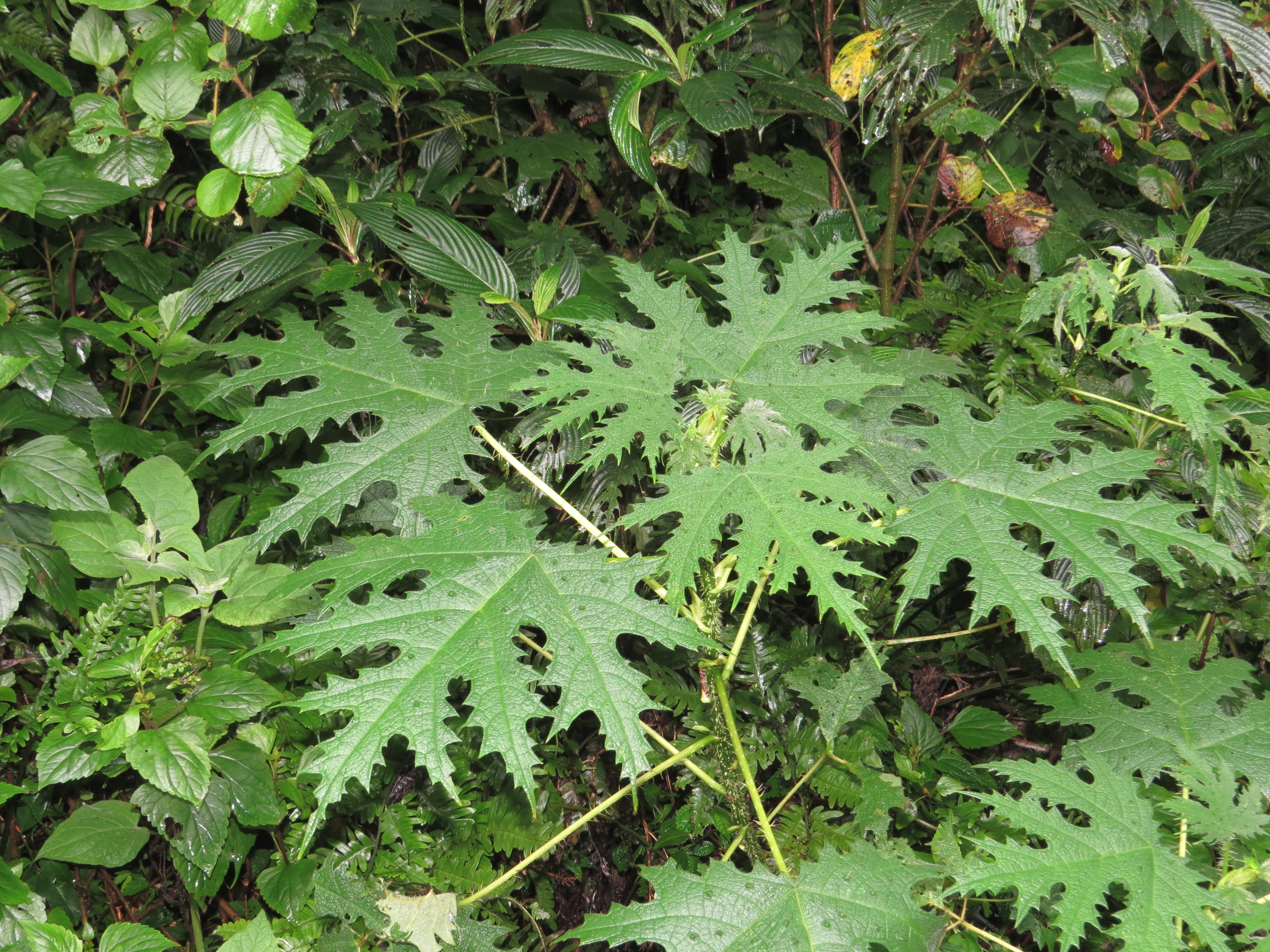
- Girardinia diversifolia

Scientific classification
- Kingdom: Plantae
- Clade: Tracheophytes
- Clade: Angiosperms
- Clade: Eudicots
- Clade: Rosids
- Order: Rosales
- Family: Urticaceae
- Tribe: Urticeae
- Genus: Girardinia; Gaudich.

= Girardinia =

Genus of plants

Girardinia is a genus of flowering plants belonging to the family Urticaceae.

Its native range is the tropical and subtropical Old World to Russian Far East. It is found in the countries of Angola, Assam, Bangladesh, Burundi, Cameroon, China, East and West Himalayas, Eswatini, Ethiopia, Guinea, India, Inner Mongolia, Ivory Coast, Java, Kenya, Korea, Laos, Lesser Sunda Islands, Liberia, Madagascar, Malawi, Manchuria, Mozambique, Myanmar, Nepal, Nigeria, Northern Provinces (of South Africa), Primorye (region of Russia), Rwanda, Sri Lanka, Sudan, Sulawesi, Sumatra, Taiwan, Tanzania, Thailand, Tibet, Uganda, Vietnam, Yemen, Zambia, Zaïre and Zimbabwe.

The genus name of Girardinia is in honour of Jean Pierre Louis Girardin (1803–1884), a French agricultural chemist and professor in Rouen and Lille. It was first described and published in Voy. Uranie on page 498 in 1830.

Known species:

- Girardinia bullosa (Hochst. ex Steud.) Wedd.
- Girardinia diversifolia (Link) Friis
