= Capsulea =

Scientific classification
- Kingdom: Plantae
- Clade: Tracheophytes
- Clade: Angiosperms
- Clade: Eudicots
- Clade: Rosids
- Order: Rosales
- Family: Urticaceae
- Genus: Capsulea; Yong Wang (2021)
- Species: C. bashanensis

Binomial name
- Capsulea bashanensis Yong Wang (2021)

Genus of flowering plants

Capsulea bashanensis is a species of flowering plant in the nettle family, Urticaceae. It is the sole species in genus Capsulea. It is endemic to Shaanxi province in north-central China.
