= Archiboehmeria =

Scientific classification
- Kingdom: Plantae
- Clade: Tracheophytes
- Clade: Angiosperms
- Clade: Eudicots
- Clade: Rosids
- Order: Rosales
- Family: Urticaceae
- Genus: Archiboehmeria; C.J.Chen

Genus of flowering plants

Archiboehmeria is a genus of flowering plants belonging to the family Urticaceae.

Its native range is Southeastern China to Northern Vietnam.

Species:

- Archiboehmeria atrata (Gagnep.) C.J.Chen
