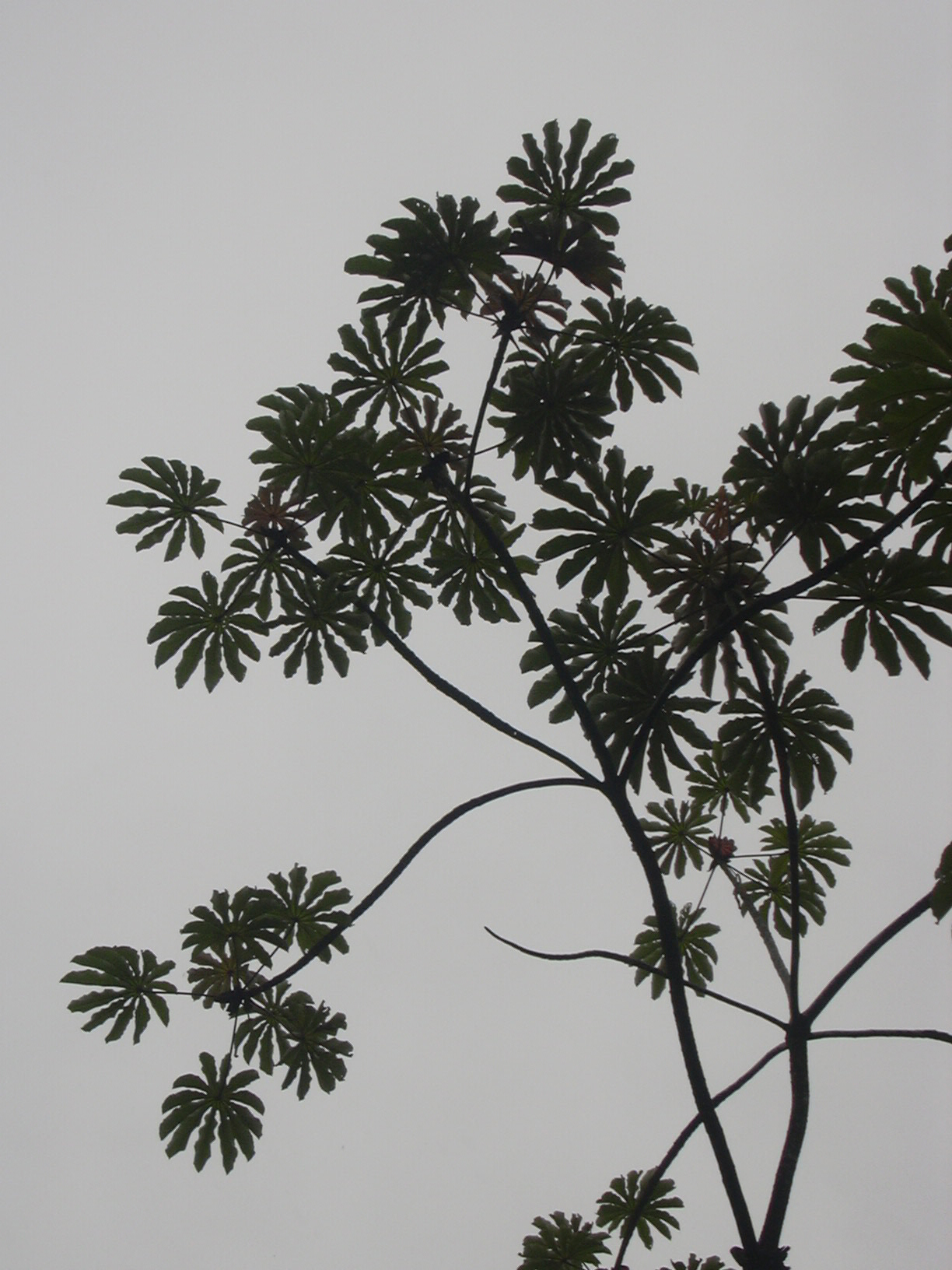

Conservation status
- Least Concern (IUCN 2.3)

Scientific classification
- Kingdom: Plantae
- Clade: Tracheophytes
- Clade: Angiosperms
- Clade: Eudicots
- Clade: Rosids
- Order: Rosales
- Family: Urticaceae
- Genus: Cecropia
- Species: C. obtusifolia

Binomial name
- Cecropia obtusifolia Bertol.

Synonyms
- Ambaiba commutata (Schott ex Miq.) Kuntze; Ambaiba costaricensis Kuntze; Ambaiba hemsleyana Kuntze; Ambaiba mexicana (Hemsl.) Kuntze; Ambaiba obtusifolia (Bertol.) Kuntze; Ambaiba panamensis (Hemsl.) Kuntze; Cecropia alvarezii Cuatrec.; Cecropia amphichlora Standl. & L.O.Williams; Cecropia burriada Cuatrec.; Cecropia commutata Schott ex Miq.; Cecropia concolor Miq. nom. illeg.; Cecropia dabeibana Cuatrec.; Cecropia levyana Aladar Richt.; Cecropia maxonii Pittier; Cecropia mexicana Hemsl.; Cecropia panamensis Hemsl.

= Cecropia obtusifolia =

Species of flowering plant

Cecropia obtusifolia is a species of plant in the family Urticaceae. It is found in Colombia, Costa Rica, Nicaragua, Ecuador, El Salvador, Mexico and Panama. Common Names include blunt-leaved trumpet tree, pop-a-gun, tree-of-laziness, and snakewood tree. In Central America it is known as Guarumo. Though impressive silhouetted against the sky, it is an invasive species in the islands of Hawaii.

Cecropia obtusifolia is used in traditional Amerindian medicine. Many other species of the genus Cecropia share the folk reputation of curing heart failure, cough, asthma and bronchitis. Cecropia obtusifolia has vasorelaxant activity due possibly to inhibition of angiotensin.
