= Metapilea =

Scientific classification
- Kingdom: Plantae
- Clade: Tracheophytes
- Clade: Angiosperms
- Clade: Eudicots
- Clade: Rosids
- Order: Rosales
- Family: Urticaceae
- Genus: Metapilea; W.T.Wang (2016)
- Species: M. jingxiensis

Binomial name
- Metapilea jingxiensis W.T.Wang (2016)

Genus of flowering plants

Metapilea jingxiensis is a species of flowering plant in the nettle family, Urticaceae. It is the sole species in genus Metapilea. It is native to Guangxi autonomous region in southeastern China.
