= Astrothalamus =

Scientific classification
- Kingdom: Plantae
- Clade: Embryophytes
- Clade: Tracheophytes
- Clade: Spermatophytes
- Clade: Angiosperms
- Clade: Eudicots
- Clade: Rosids
- Order: Rosales
- Family: Urticaceae
- Genus: Astrothalamus; C.B.Rob.

Genus of flowering plants

Astrothalamus is a genus of flowering plants belonging to the family Urticaceae.

Its native range extends from Northern Borneo to the Philippines.

The species include:

- Astrothalamus reticulatus (Wedd.) C.B.Rob.
