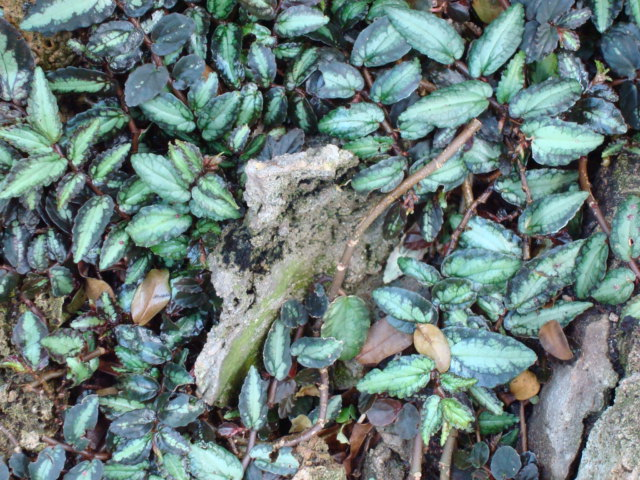
- Pellionia repens

Scientific classification
- Kingdom: Plantae
- Clade: Tracheophytes
- Clade: Angiosperms
- Clade: Eudicots
- Clade: Rosids
- Order: Rosales
- Family: Urticaceae
- Tribe: Elatostemateae
- Genus: Pellionia; Gaudich.

Species
- See text

= Pellionia =

Genus of flowering plants

Pellionia is a genus of flowering plants in the family Urticaceae. The flowers of Pellionia are white globules held on stalks above the plant, which respond to changes in temperature by releasing their pollen as little puffs of smoke.

== Species ==
The following species are recognised in the genus Pellionia:

- Pellionia annamica Gagnep.
- Pellionia brachyceras W.T.Wang
- Pellionia calcifera W.T.Wang
- Pellionia cephaloidea W.T.Wang
- Pellionia donglanensis W.T.Wang
- Pellionia elatostemoides Gaudich.
- Pellionia fruticosa Ridl.
- Pellionia funingensis W.T.Wang
- Pellionia griffithiana Wedd.
- Pellionia jinyunensis C.Xiong, Feng Chen & H.P.Deng
- Pellionia laibinensis W.T.Wang
- Pellionia longipetiolata Ridl.
- Pellionia longzhouensis W.T.Wang
- Pellionia minima Makino
- Pellionia mollissima W.T.Wang
- Pellionia paucidentata (H.Schroet.) S.S.Chien
- Pellionia pauciflora W.T.Wang
- Pellionia pellucida (Raf.) Merr.
- Pellionia retrohispida W.T.Wang
- Pellionia ronganensis W.T.Wang & Y.G.Wei
- Pellionia simianschanica W.T.Wang
- Pellionia subundulata W.T.Wang
- Pellionia sumatrana S.Moore
- Pellionia thorelii Gagnep.
- Pellionia tonkinensis Gagnep.
- Pellionia tritepala W.T.Wang
- Pellionia tsoongii (Merr.) Merr.
- Pellionia viridis C.H.Wright
