= Zhengyia =

Scientific classification
- Kingdom: Plantae
- Clade: Tracheophytes
- Clade: Angiosperms
- Clade: Eudicots
- Clade: Rosids
- Order: Rosales
- Family: Urticaceae
- Tribe: Urticeae
- Genus: Zhengyia; T.Deng, D.G.Zhang & H.Sun

Genus of flowering plants

Zhengyia is a genus of flowering plants belonging to the family Urticaceae.

Its native range is Southern Central China.

Species:

- Zhengyia shennongensis T.Deng, D.G.Zhang & H.Sun
