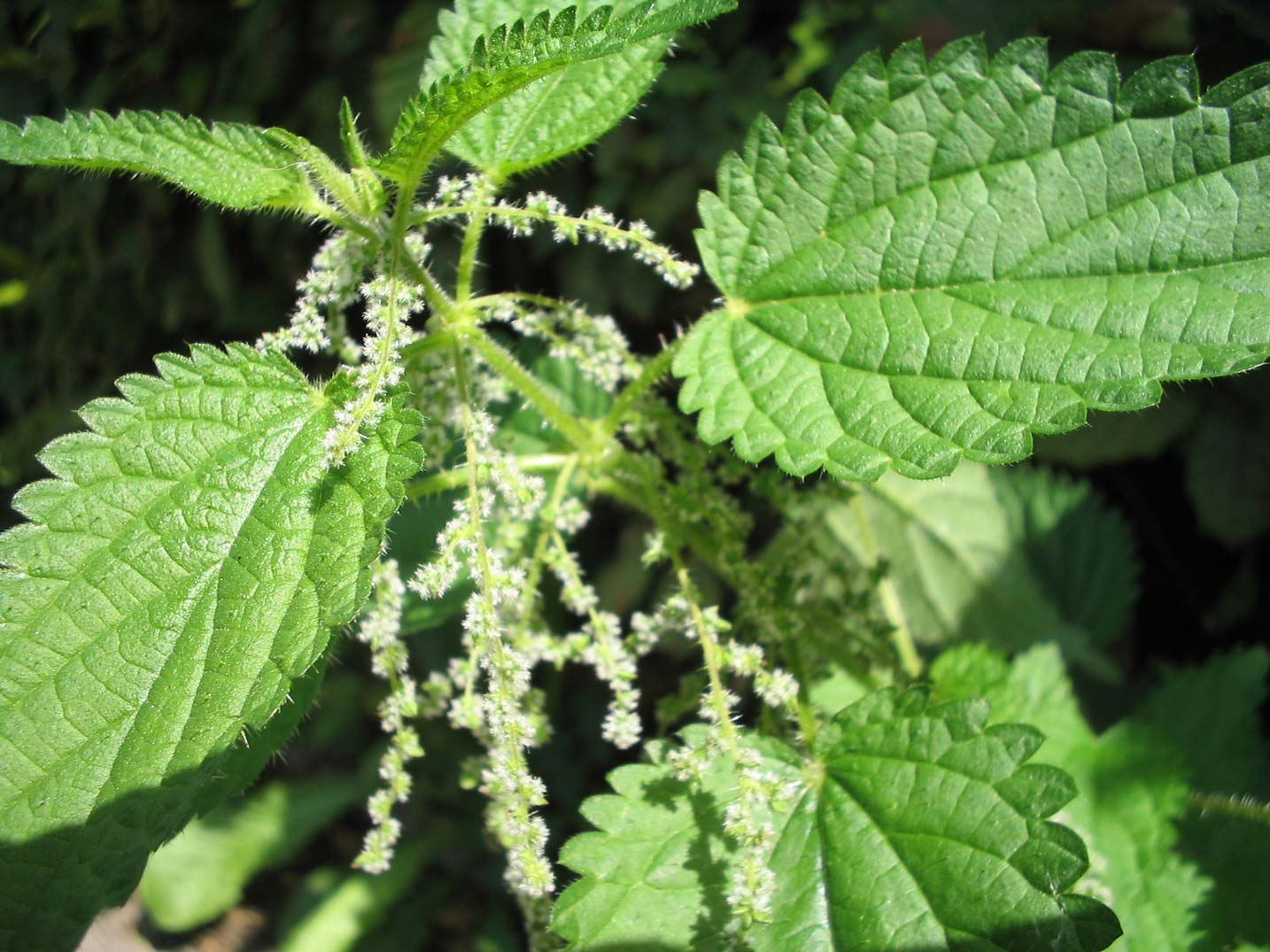
- Urtica dioica (stinging nettle)

Scientific classification
- Kingdom: Plantae
- Clade: Tracheophytes
- Clade: Angiosperms
- Clade: Eudicots
- Clade: Rosids
- Order: Rosales
- Family: Urticaceae; Juss., 1789

Synonyms
- Cecropiaceae C.C.Berg

= Urticaceae =

Nettle family

Nettle family of plants

The Urticaceae /ɜːrtɪˈkeɪsiː/ are a family, the nettle family, of flowering plants. The family name comes from the genus Urtica. The Urticaceae family includes a number of well-known and useful plants, including nettles in the genus Urtica, Ramie (Boehmeria nivea), māmaki (Pipturus albidus), and ajlai (Debregeasia saeneb).

The family includes about 2,625 species, grouped into 53 genera. The largest genera are Pilea (500 to 715 species), Elatostema (300 species), Urtica (80 species), and Cecropia (75 species). Cecropia contains many myrmecophytes.

Urticaceae species can be found worldwide, but most species are found in tropical ecosystems, especially tropical Asia.

== Description ==
Urticaceae species can be herbs (e.g. Urtica, Parietaria), shrubs(e.g. Pilea), hemi-epiphytes, or, rarely, trees (Dendrocnide, Cecropia). Their leaves are usually entire and bear stipules.

Urticating hairs are often present. Stinging trichomes on the leaves break upon contact, imbedding a sharp tip into animal skin which is filled with an irritating liquid. This liquid consists of compounds such as histamines and acetylcholines that create an irritating skin reaction. These urticating trichomes are an herbivory defense against primarily mammals, but also defend against invertebrate herbivory as well.

Urticaceae flowers are typically unisexual, with rare cases of functionally hermaphroditic flowers. Pistillate flowers have superior pseudomonomerous ovaries extending to one style. This family has a gynoecium with two carpels, and a perianth of four to five. Urticacids explosively release their pollen when their urticaceaous stamens dry in the heat, causing the filaments to straighten and the anthers to release pollen in a swift motion. Plants are then wind-pollinated. Fruits are achenes.

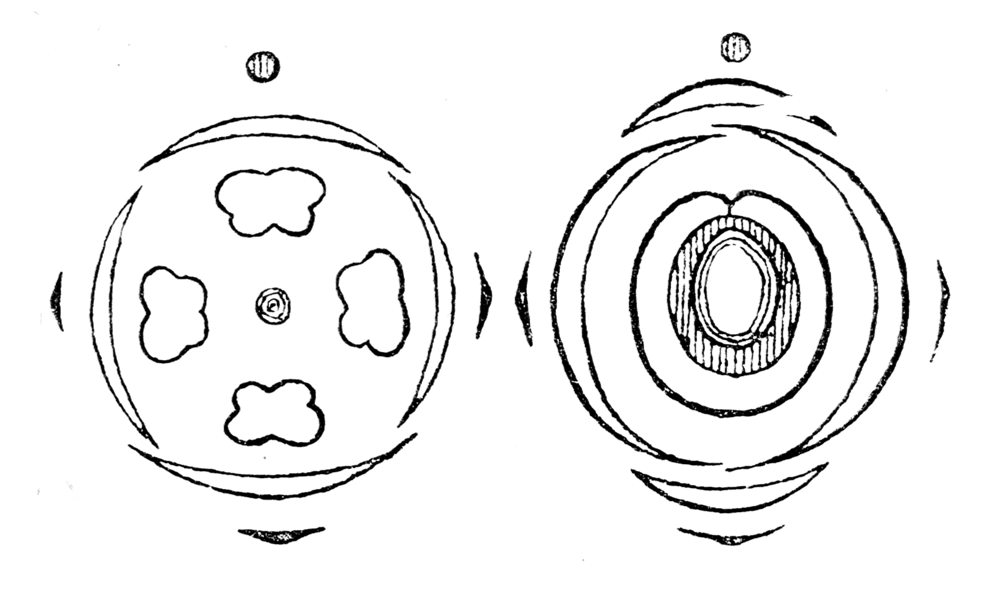
Male and female flower of Urtica

Additional characteristics represented by members in the family are leaves with cystolith or silicone accumulation. Some members exhibit latex presence only in the bark as an anti-herbivory defense.

While the stings delivered by Urticaceae species are often unpleasant, they seldom pose any direct threat to health, and deaths directly attributed to stinging are exceedingly rare; species known to cause human fatalities include Dendrocnide cordata and Urtica ferox.

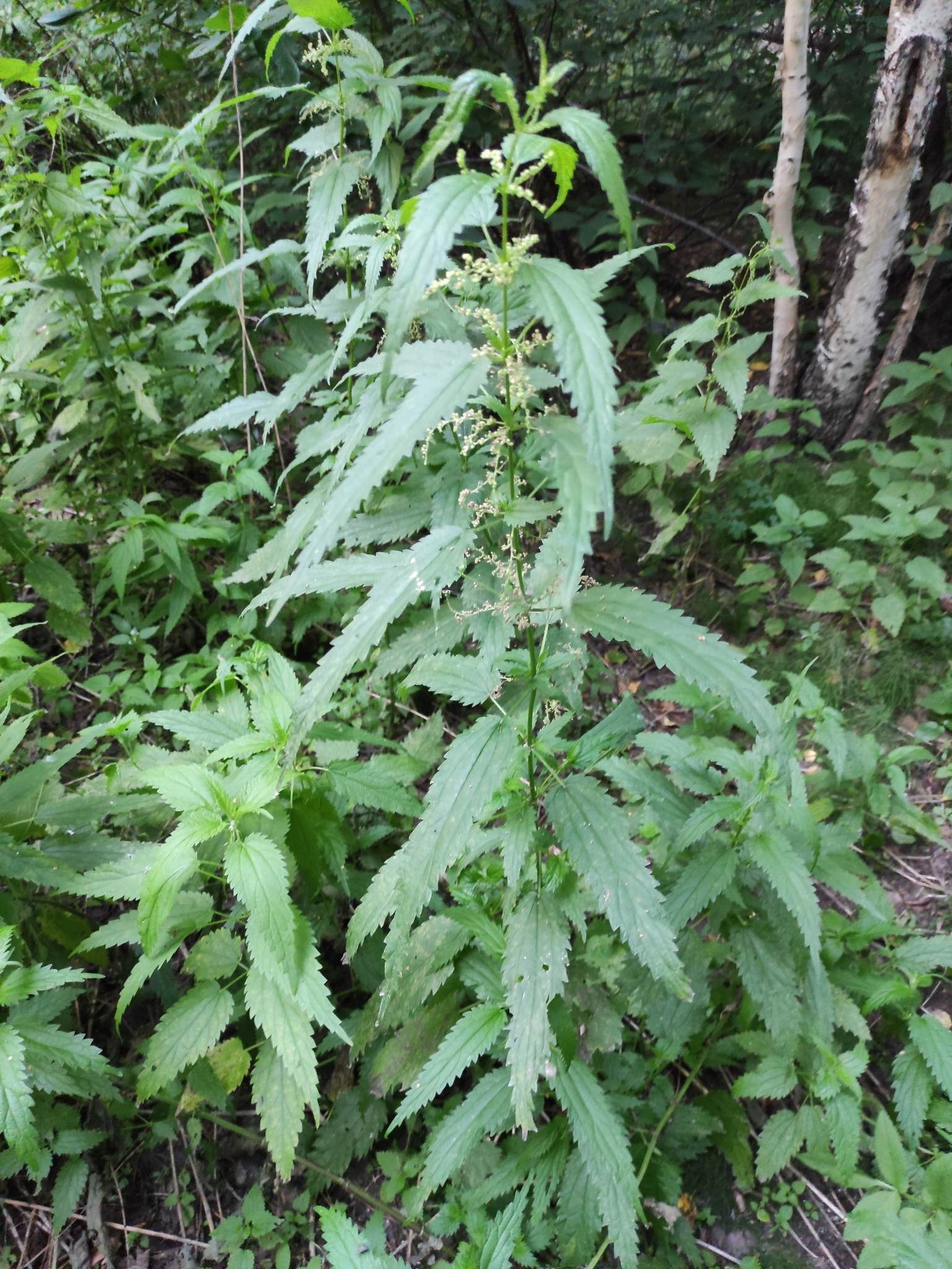
Urtica angustifolia, East-Asian Nettle

== Uses ==
Many members of Urticaceae are cultivated and foraged worldwide for various uses, including food, medicines, and to create tools. Some notable species include:

- Pouzolzia mixta (soap nettle), is used as a culinary herb, made into rope, and is a source of traditional medicine in several southern African countries.
- Urtica angustifolia, which grows throughout eastern Asia, is an important traditional Chinese medicine plant.
- Cecropia obtusa, Laportea aestuans, and Urera baccifera are all species used as anti-inflammatory and diabetes medicine in Brazil.
- While Urtica dioica stinging hairs cause inflammation, the plant has been used to treat a large variety of medical issues, including, but not limited to: arthritis, gout, anemia, and eczema.

== Diseases ==
The Urticaceae are subject to many bacterial, viral, fungal, and nematode parasitic diseases. Among them are:

- Bacterial leaf spot, caused by Xanthomonas campestris which affects Pellionia, Pilea, and other genera.
- Anthracnose, a fungal disease caused by Colletotrichum capsici which affects Pilea.
- Myrothecium leaf spot, a fungal disease caused by Myrothecium roridum which affects plants throughout the Urticaceae, as well as other angiosperms
- Phytophthora blight, a water mold disease caused by Phytophthora nicotianae which affects Pilea
- Southern blight, a fungal disease caused by Athelia rolfsii which affects both Pellionia and Pilea

== Fossil record ==
The fossil record of Urticaceae is scattered and mostly based on dispersed fruits. Twelve species based on fossil achenes are known from the Late Cretaceous of Central Europe. Most were assigned to the extant genera Boehmeria (three species), Debregeasia (one species) and Pouzolzia (three species), while three species were assigned to the extinct genus Urticoidea.

A Colombian fossil flora of the Maastrichtian stage has yielded leaves that resemble leaves of the tribe Ceropieae.

In the Cenozoic fossil leaves from the Ypresian Allenby Formation preserve distinct trichomes, and have been attributed to the Tribe Urticeae in the fossil record. The leaves had originally been identified as Rubus by earlier workers on the Eocene Okanagan Highlands, but Devore et al (2020) interpreted the preserved hairs along the stem and major veins as stinging trichomes, rather than simple hairs or thorns.

== Taxonomy ==
=== Classification ===
The APG II system puts the Urticaceae in the order Rosales, while older systems consider them part of the Urticales, along with Ulmaceae, Moraceae, and Cannabaceae. Urticaceae is a monophyletic group.

=== Phylogeny ===
Modern molecular phylogenetics suggest the following relationships (see also):

- - Moraceae (outgroup)
  - Urticaceae
    - - Urticeae
        - - Laportea
          - - - Obetia
              - Urera pro parte
            - - Touchardia
              - - Urera pro parte
                - Poikilospermum
        - - - Girardinia
            - - Dendrocnide
              - Discocnide
          - - Nanocnide
            - Urtica (including Hesperocnide)
      - Elatostemateae
        - - Procris
          - - Pellionia
            - Elatostema
        - - Myriocarpa + Gyrotaenia
          - - Lecanthus
            - Pilea (including Sarcopilea)
    - - Cecropieae
        - - Coussapoa
          - - Myrianthus
            - Cecropia
        - - Leucosyke
          - Maoutia
      - - Boehmerieae
          - Oreocnide
          - - Phenax
            - - - Chamabainia
                - - - Gonostegia
                    - - Pouzolzia pro parte
                      - - Neodistemon
                        - - Rousselia
                          - Hemistylus
                  - - Pouzolzia pro parte
                    - - Neraudia
                      - Pipturus (including Nothocnide)
              - - Boehmeria pro parte
                - - Debregeasia
                  - - Astrothalamus
                    - - Archiboehmeria
                      - - Boehmeria pro parte
                        - Sarcochlamys
        - - Forsskaoleeae
            - Forsskaolea
            - - Didymodoxa
              - Droguetia (including Australina)
          - Parietarieae
            - Parietaria
            - - Soleirolia
              - Gesnouinia

=== Tribes and genera ===
- Boehmerieae Gaudich. 1830
  - Archiboehmeria C.J. Chen 1980 (1 sp.)
  - Astrothalamus C.B. Rob. 1911 (1 sp.)
  - Boehmeria Jacq. 1760 (80 spp.)
  - Chamabainia Wight 1853 (1–2 spp.)
  - Cypholophus Wedd. 1854 (15 spp.)
  - Debregeasia Gaudich. 1844 (4 spp.)
  - Gibbsia Rendle 1917 (2 spp.)
  - Gonostegia Turcz. 1846 (5 spp.)
  - Hemistylus Benth. 1843 (4 spp.)
  - Neodistemon Babu & A. N. Henry 1970 (1 sp.)
  - Neraudia Gaudich. 1830 (5 spp.)
  - Nothocnide Blume 1856 (4 spp.)
  - Oreocnide Miq. 1851 (15 spp.)
  - Phenax Wedd. 1854 (12 spp.)
  - Pipturus Wedd. 1854 (30 spp.)
  - Pouzolzia Gaudich. 1826 [1830] (70 spp.)
  - Rousselia Gaudich. 1826 [1830] (3 spp.)
  - Sarcochlamys Gaudich. 1844 (1 sp.)
- Cecropieae Gaudich. 1830
  - Cecropia Loefl. 1758 (70–80 spp.)
  - Coussapoa Aubl. 1775 (>50 spp.)
  - Leucosyke Zoll. & Moritzi 1845 (35 spp.)
  - Maoutia Wedd. 1854 (15 spp.)
  - Musanga R. Br. in Tuckey 1818 (2 spp.)
  - Myrianthus P. Beauv. 1804 [1805] (7 spp.)
  - Pourouma Aubl. 1775 (>50 spp.)
- Elatostemateae Gaudich. 1830
  - Aboriella Bennet (1 sp.) (synonym of Achudemia)
  - Achudemia Blume 1856
  - Elatostema J.R. Forst. & G. Forst. 1775 (300 spp.)
  - Gyrotaenia Griseb. 1861 (4 spp.)
  - Lecanthus Wedd. 1854 (4 sp.) (syn. Meniscogyne Gagnep. 1928)
  - Myriocarpa Benth. 1844 [1846] (18 spp.)
  - Pellionia Gaudich. 1826 (60 spp.)
  - Petelotiella Gagnep. in Lecomte 1929 (1 spp.)
  - Pilea Lindl. 1821 (606 spp.) (syn. Sarcopilea Urb. 1912)
  - Procris Comm. ex Juss. 1789 (24 spp.)
- Forsskaoleeae Gaudich. 1830
  - Australina Gaudich. 1830 (2 spp.)
  - Didymodoxa E. Mey. ex Wedd. 1857 (2 spp.)
  - Droguetia Gaudich. 1830 (7 spp.)
  - Forsskaolea L. 1764 (6 spp.)
- Parietarieae Gaudich. 1830
  - Gesnouinia Gaudich. 1830 (2 spp.)
  - Parietaria L. 1753 (20 spp.)
  - Soleirolia Gaudich. 1830 (1 sp.)
- Urticeae Lamarck & DC. 1806
  - Dendrocnide Miq. 1851 (27 spp.)
  - Discocnide Chew 1965 (1 sp.)
  - Girardinia Gaudich. 1830 (2 spp.)
  - Hesperocnide Torr. 1857 (2 spp.)
  - Laportea Gaudich. 1826 [1830] (21 spp.)
  - Nanocnide Blume 1856 (2 spp.)
  - Obetia Gaudich. 1844 (7 spp.)
  - Poikilospermum Zipp. ex Miq. 1864 (20 spp.)
  - Touchardia Gaudich. 1847 (1–2 spp.)
  - Urera Gaudich. 1826 [1830] (35 spp.)
  - Urtica L. 1753—nettle (80 spp.)
  - Zhengyia T.Deng, D.G.Zhang & H.Sun 2013 (1 sp.)
- Incertae sedis
  - Capsulea Yong Wang 2021 (1 sp.)
  - Elatostematoides C.B.Rob. 1910 publ. 1911 (25 sp.)
  - Metapilea W.T.Wang 2016 (1 sp.)
  - Metatrophis F.Br. 1935 (1 sp.)
  - Parsana Parsa & Maleki 1952 (1 sp.)
  - Scepocarpus Wedd. 1869 (14 sp.)

== Image gallery ==
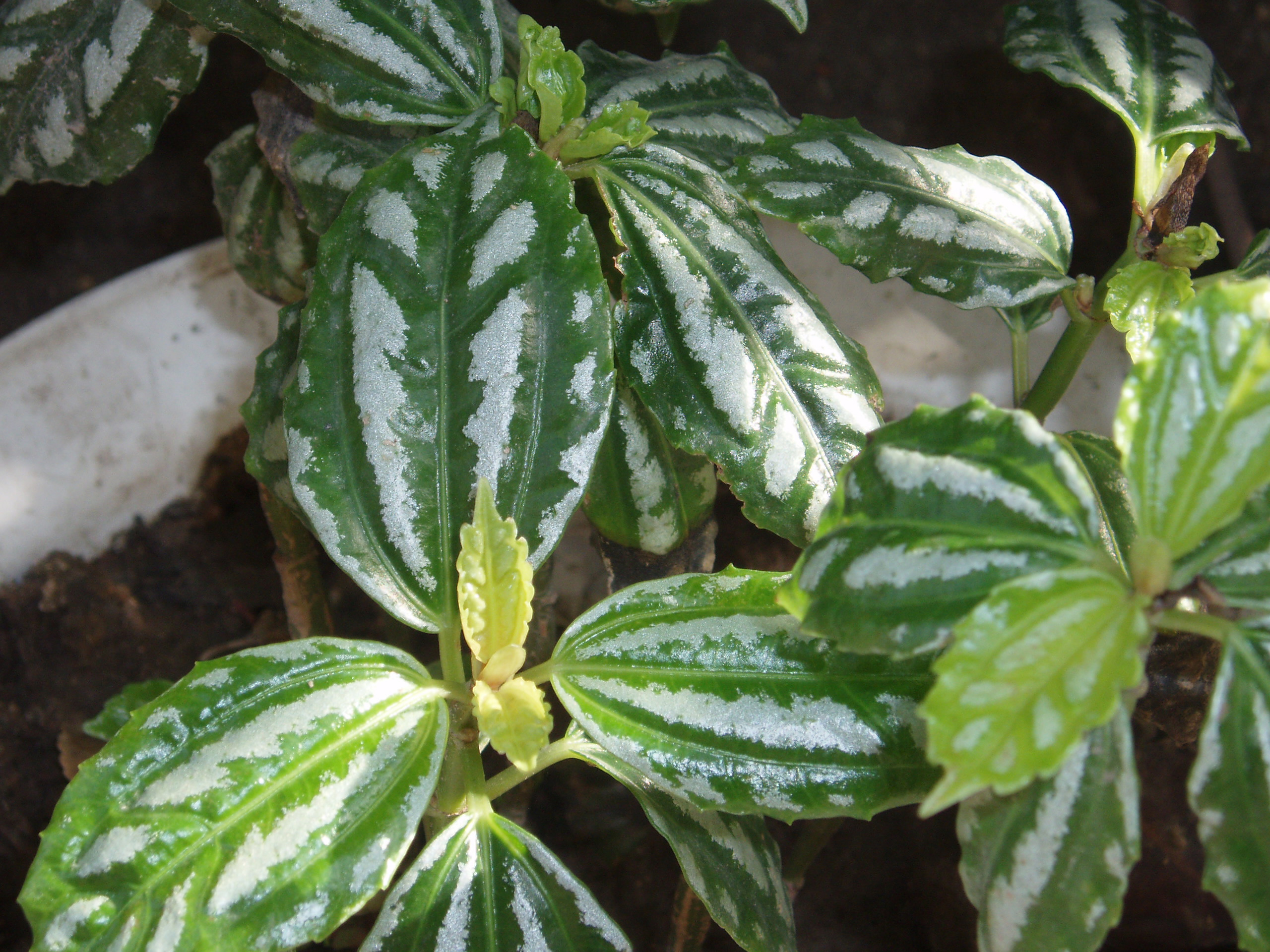
Pilea cadierei

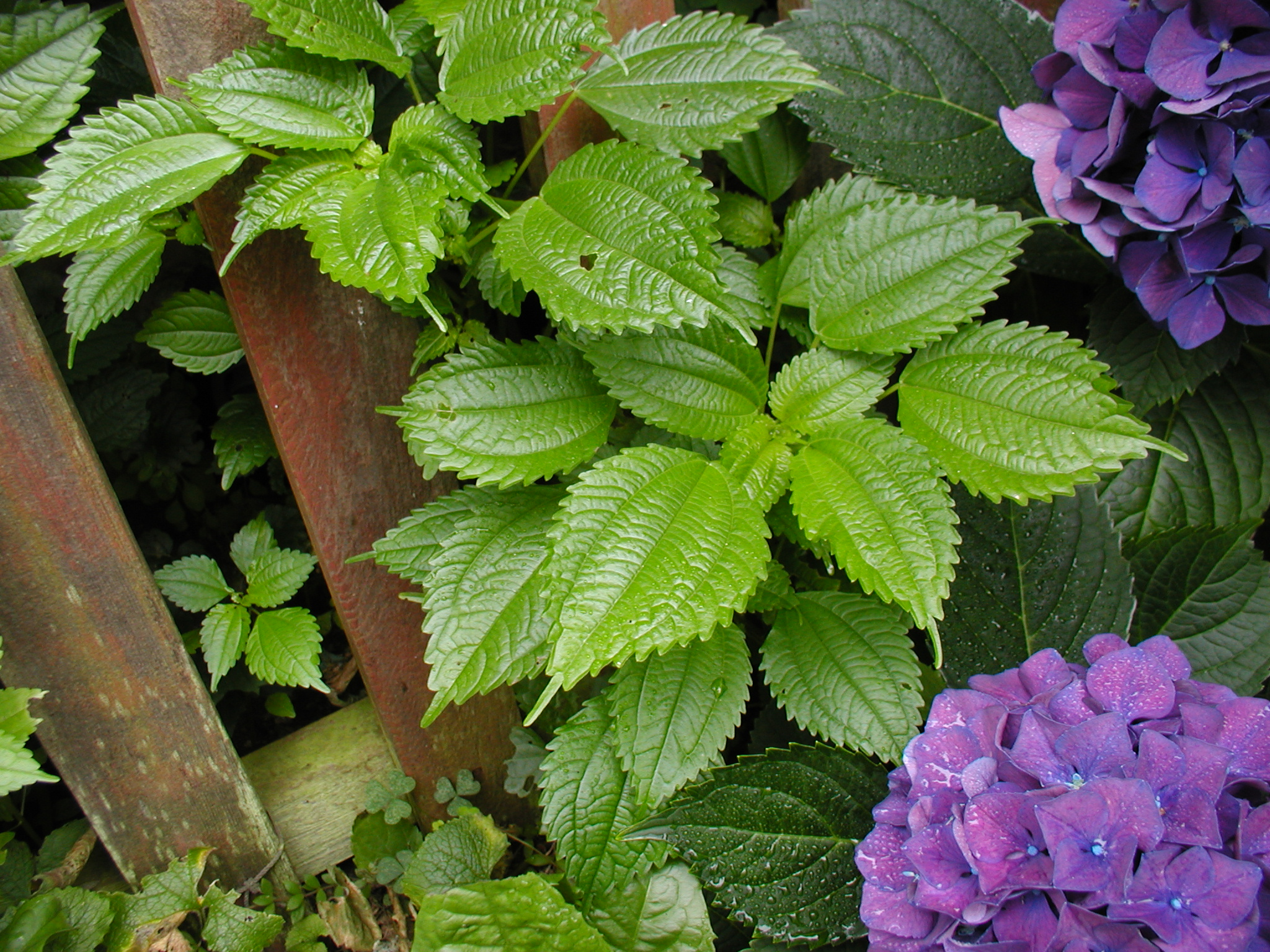
Pilea pumila

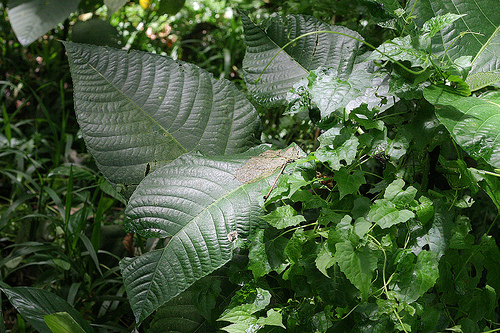
Dendrocnide sp.

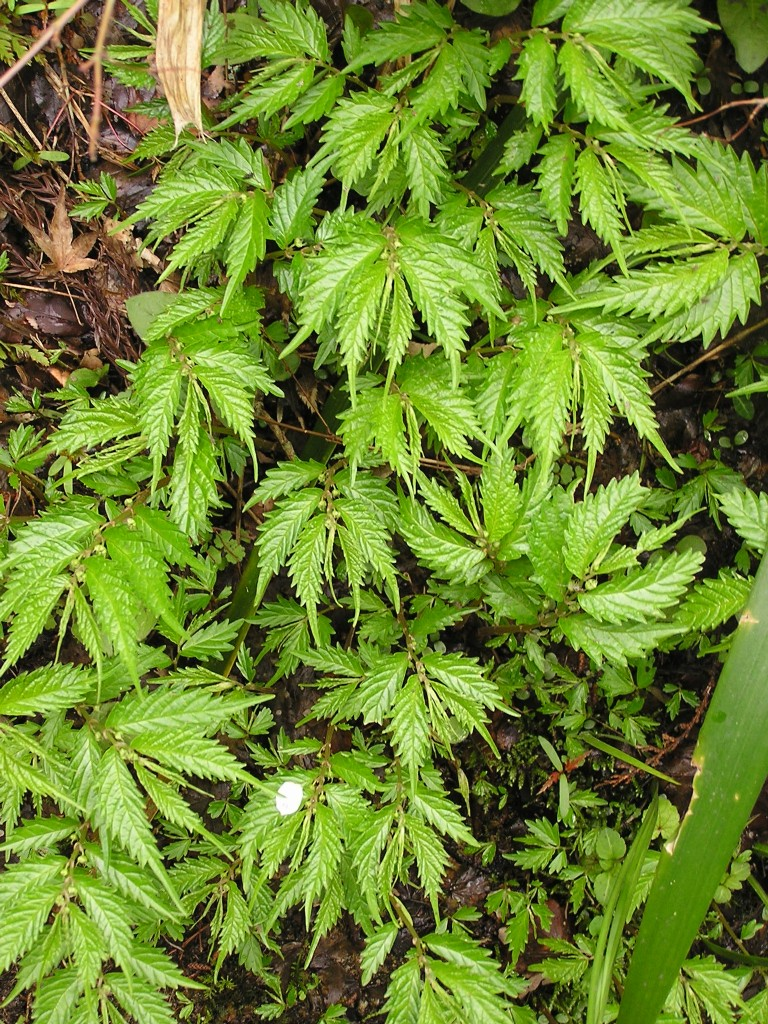
Elatostema umbellatum

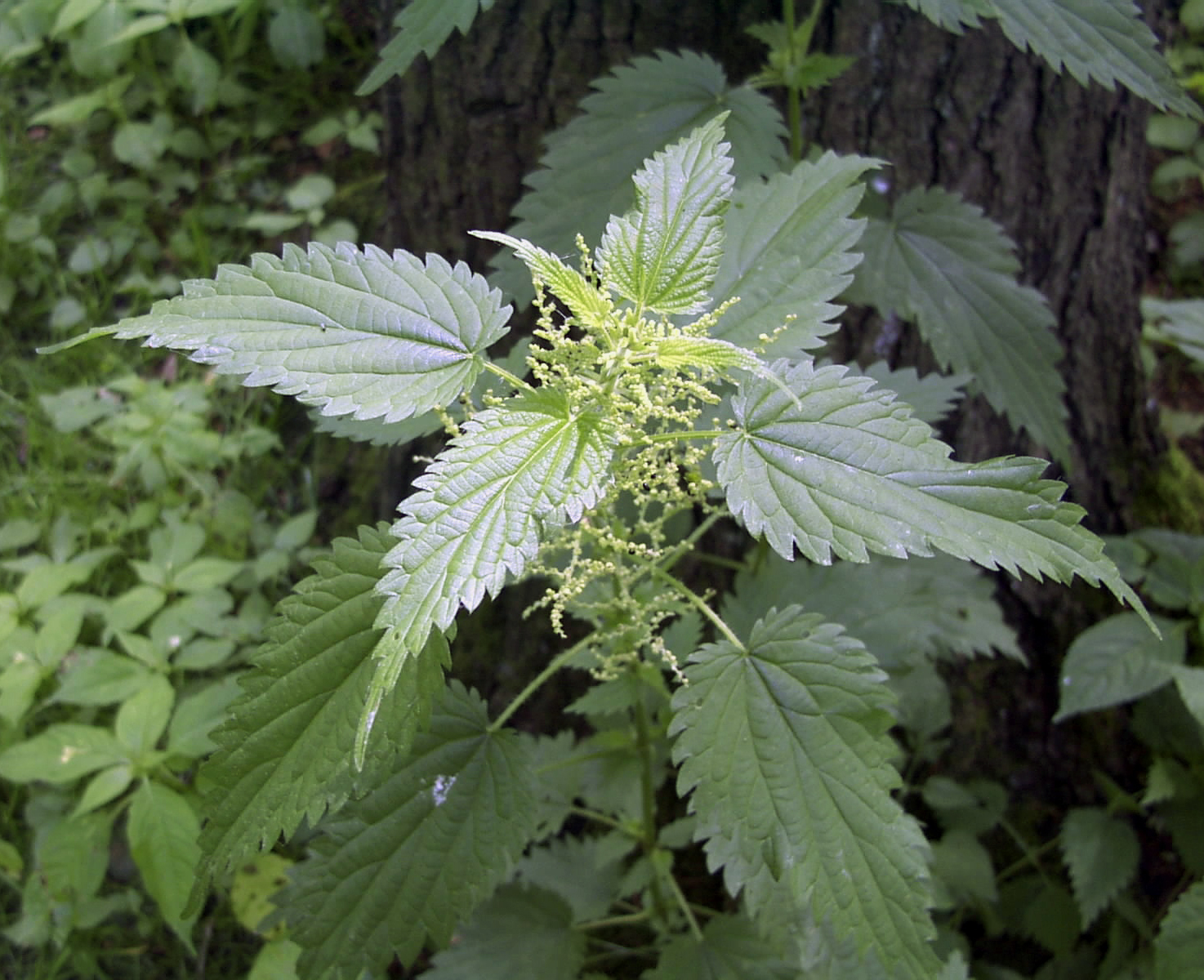
Urtica dioica

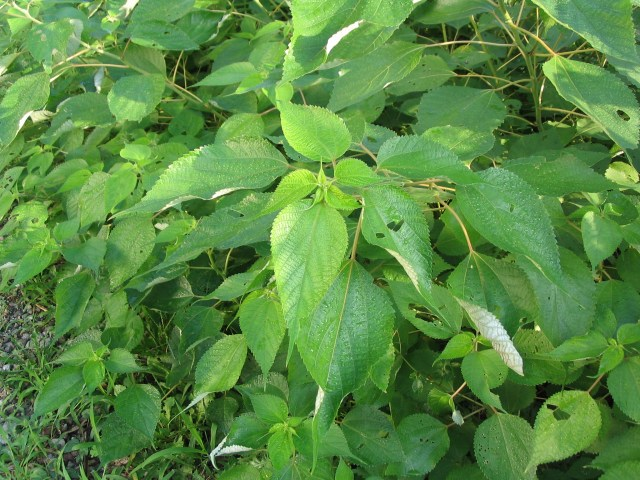
Boehmeria nivea

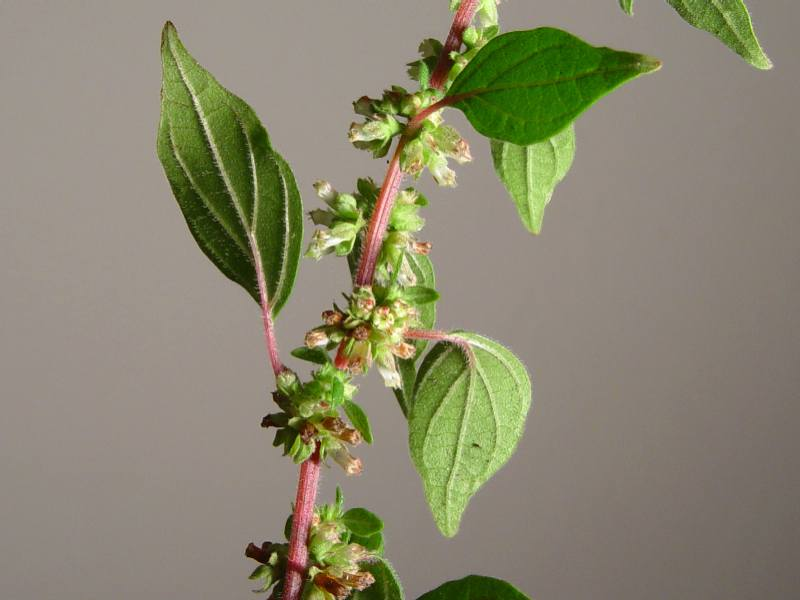
Parietaria judaica flowers

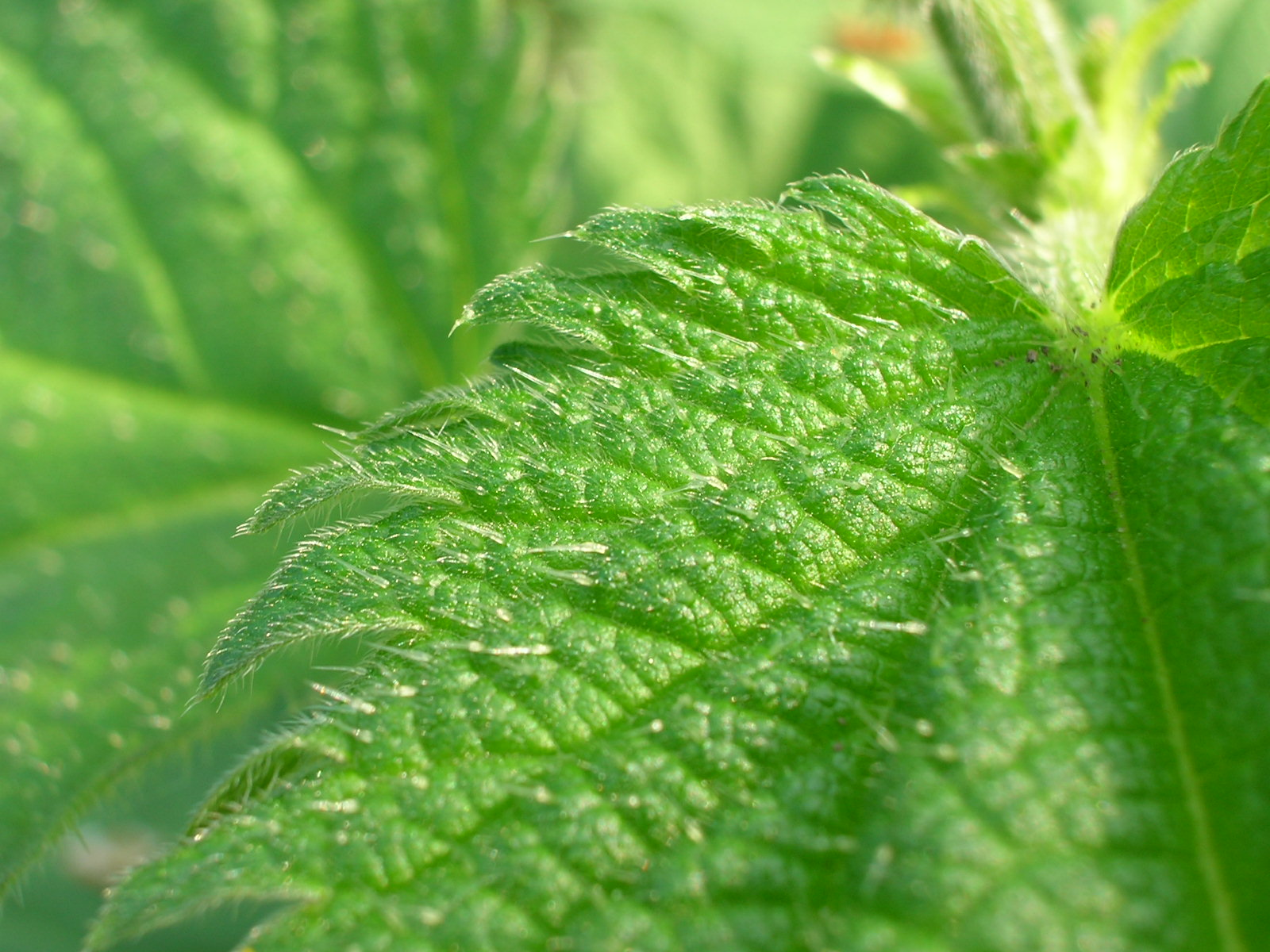
Urtica dioica stinging hairs

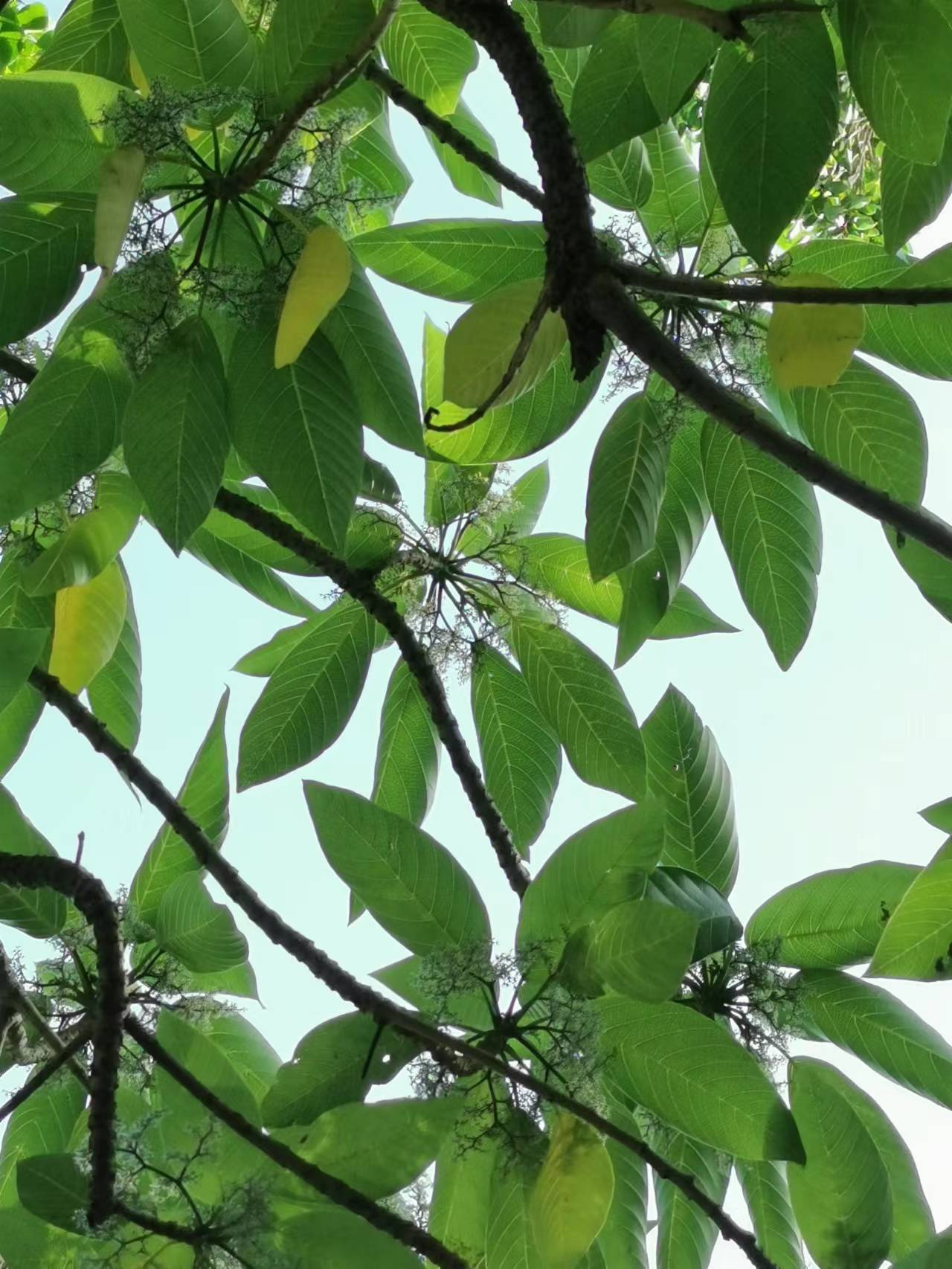
Leaves of Dendrocnide meyeniana

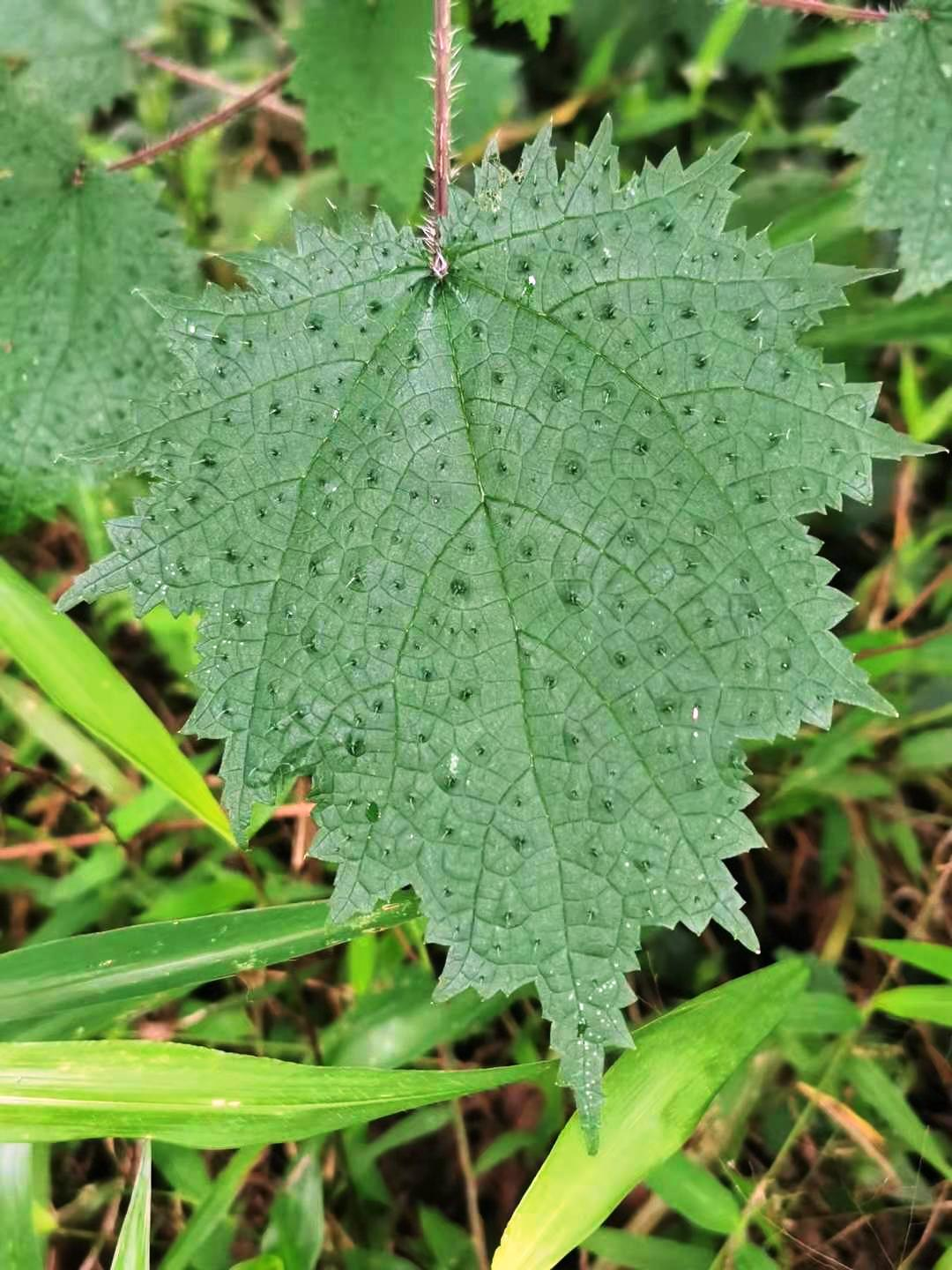
The dotted bumps on the leaves of Urtica thunbergiana
