= Sarcochlamys =

Scientific classification
- Kingdom: Plantae
- Clade: Tracheophytes
- Clade: Angiosperms
- Clade: Eudicots
- Clade: Rosids
- Order: Rosales
- Family: Urticaceae
- Tribe: Boehmerieae
- Genus: Sarcochlamys; Gaudich.
- Species: S. pulcherrima

Binomial name
- Sarcochlamys pulcherrima (Roxb.) Gaudich.

Genus of plants

Sarcochlamys is a monotypic genus of flowering plants belonging to the family Urticaceae. The only species is Sarcochlamys pulcherrima. It is a dioecious, evergreen shrub or small tree.

Its native range is Eastern Himalaya to Southern Central China and Northern Indo-China.
