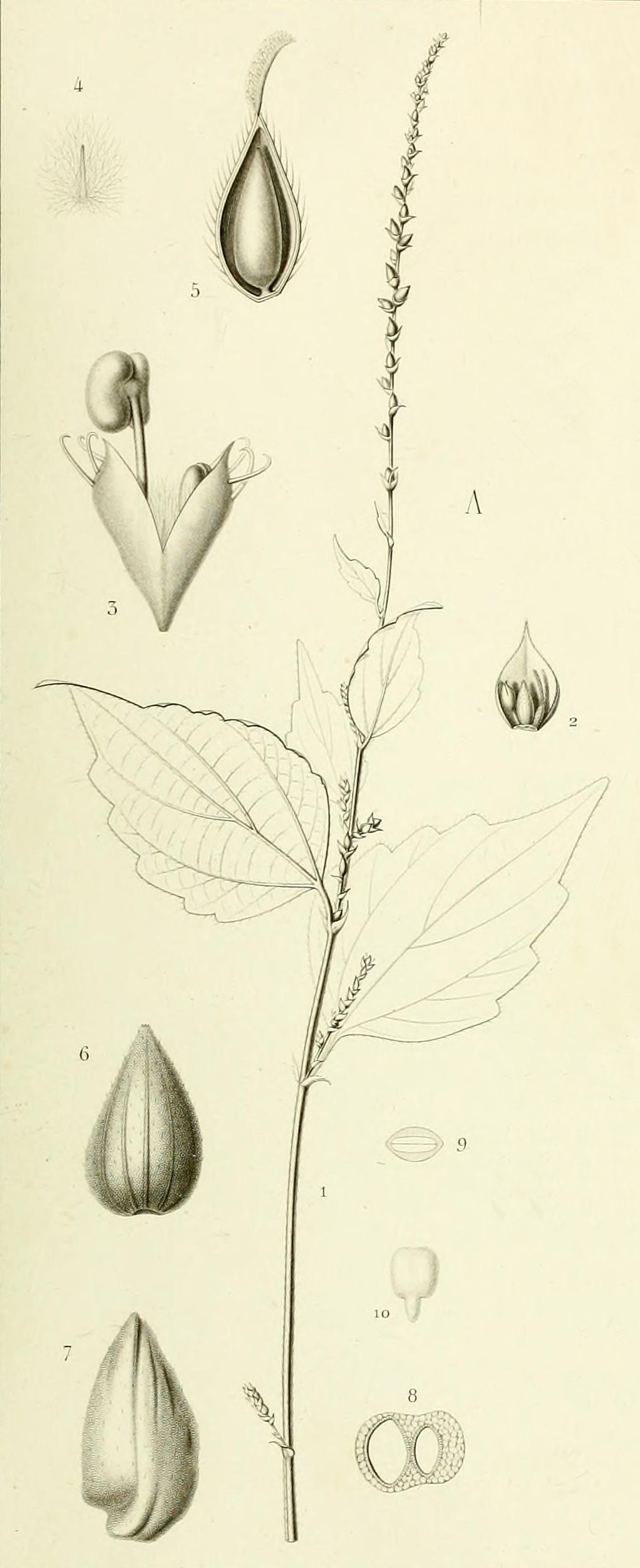
- Neodistemon indicus by Hugh A. Weddell

Scientific classification
- Kingdom: Plantae
- Clade: Tracheophytes
- Clade: Angiosperms
- Clade: Eudicots
- Clade: Rosids
- Order: Rosales
- Family: Urticaceae
- Tribe: Boehmerieae
- Genus: Neodistemon; Babu & A.N.Henry
- Species: N. indicus

Binomial name
- Neodistemon indicus (Wedd.) Babu & A.N.Henry

Synonyms
- Of the genus: Distemon Wedd.; Of the species: Australina diandra Wedd.; Distemon grossus Wedd.; Distemon indicus Wedd.; Urtica grossa Wall., not validly publ.

= Neodistemon =

Genus of plants

Neodistemon is a monotypic genus of flowering plants belonging to the family Urticaceae. The only species is Neodistemon indicus.

Its native range is from the Indian subcontinent to Indo-China.
