= Scepocarpus =

Scientific classification
- Kingdom: Plantae
- Clade: Tracheophytes
- Clade: Angiosperms
- Clade: Eudicots
- Clade: Rosids
- Order: Rosales
- Family: Urticaceae
- Genus: Scepocarpus; Wedd. (1869)

Species
- 14; see text

Genus of flowering plants

Scepocarpus is a genus of flowering plants in the family Urticaceae. It includes 14 species native to tropical and southern Africa.

== Species ==
14 species are accepted.

- Scepocarpus batesii (Rendle) T.Wells & A.K.Monro
- Scepocarpus cordifolius (Engl.) T.Wells & A.K.Monro
- Scepocarpus flamignianus (Lambinon) T.Wells & A.K.Monro
- Scepocarpus gabonensis (Pierre ex Friis) T.Wells & A.K.Monro
- Scepocarpus hypselodendron (Hochst. ex A.Rich.) T.Wells & A.K.Monro
- Scepocarpus mannii Wedd.
- Scepocarpus oblongifolius (Benth.) T.Wells & A.K.Monro
- Scepocarpus obovatus (Benth.) T.Wells & A.K.Monro
- Scepocarpus repens (Wedd.) T.Wells & A.K.Monro
- Scepocarpus rigidus (Benth.) T.Wells & A.K.Monro
- Scepocarpus robustus (A.Chev.) T.Wells & A.K.Monro
- Scepocarpus sansibaricus (Engl.) T.Wells & A.K.Monro
- Scepocarpus thonneri (De Wild. & T.Durand) T.Wells & A.K.Monro
- Scepocarpus trinervis (Hochst.) T.Wells & A.K.Monro
