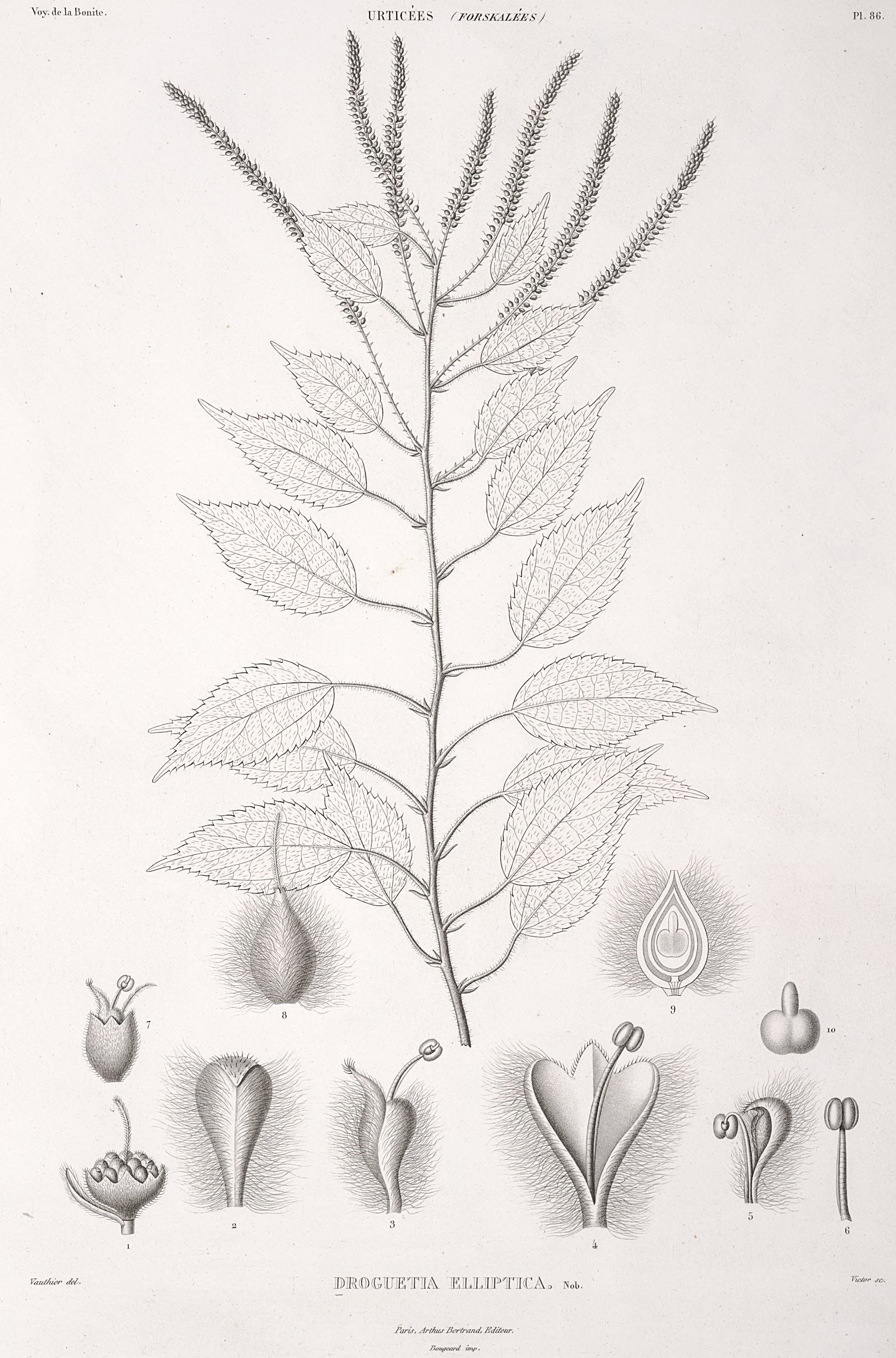
- Droguetia leptostachys as Droguetia elliptica

Scientific classification
- Kingdom: Plantae
- Clade: Tracheophytes
- Clade: Angiosperms
- Clade: Eudicots
- Clade: Rosids
- Order: Rosales
- Family: Urticaceae
- Genus: Droguetia; Gaudich.

Synonyms
- Didymogyne Wedd. Drouguetia Endl.

= Droguetia =

Genus of plants

Droguetia is a genus of flowering plants belonging to the family Urticaceae.

Its wide native range is Africa and the Arabian Peninsula and China.

Its genus name of Droguetia is in honour of Marc Julien Droguet (1769–1836), French naval doctor. and it was published in Voy. Uranie on page 505 in 1830.

Known species:

- Droguetia ambigua Wedd.
- Droguetia debilis Rendle
- Droguetia gaudichaudiana Marais
- Droguetia hildebrandtii Friis & Wilmot-Dear
- Droguetia humbertii Leandri
- Droguetia iners (Forssk.) Schweinf.
- Droguetia leptostachys (Juss. ex Pers.) Wedd.
