= Elatostematoides =

Scientific classification
- Kingdom: Plantae
- Clade: Tracheophytes
- Clade: Angiosperms
- Clade: Eudicots
- Clade: Rosids
- Order: Rosales
- Family: Urticaceae
- Genus: Elatostematoides; C.B.Rob.

Genus of plants

Elatostematoides is a genus of flowering plants belonging to the family Urticaceae.

Its native range is Malesia to Fiji.

Species:

- Elatostematoides australe (Wedd.) Yu Hsin Tseng, A.K.Monro, Y.G.Wei & J.M.Hu
- Elatostematoides caudatum Elmer
- Elatostematoides falcatum (Hallier f.) C.B.Rob.
- Elatostematoides filicoides (Seem.) Yu Hsin Tseng, A.K.Monro, Y.G.Wei & J.M.Hu
- Elatostematoides fruticulosum (K.Schum.) Yu Hsin Tseng, A.K.Monro, Y.G.Wei & J.M.Hu
- Elatostematoides gracilipes C.B.Rob.
- Elatostematoides hirtum (Ridl.) Rodda & A.K.Monro
- Elatostematoides laxum (Elmer) C.B.Rob.
- Elatostematoides lonchophyllum (H.Schroet.) Yu Hsin Tseng, A.K.Monro, Y.G.Wei & J.M.Hu
- Elatostematoides machaerophyllum (Hallier f.) C.B.Rob.
- Elatostematoides mesargyreum (Hallier f.) C.B.Rob.
- Elatostematoides pictum (Hallier f.) C.B.Rob.
- Elatostematoides polioneurum (Hallier f.) Merr.
- Elatostematoides rigidum (Wedd.) C.B.Rob.
- Elatostematoides robustum (Hallier f.) C.B.Rob.
- Elatostematoides scandens (Hallier f.) Rodda & A.K.Monro
- Elatostematoides sublaxum Elmer
- Elatostematoides vittatum (Hallier f.) C.B.Rob.
