= Rousselia =

Scientific classification
- Kingdom: Plantae
- Clade: Tracheophytes
- Clade: Angiosperms
- Clade: Eudicots
- Clade: Rosids
- Order: Rosales
- Family: Urticaceae
- Tribe: Boehmerieae
- Genus: Rousselia; Gaudich.

Synonyms
- Lithocnide Raf.; Lithocnides Raf.

Genus of flowering plant

Rousselia is a genus of flowering plants belonging to the family Urticaceae.

Its native range is south-eastern Mexico to Colombia and the Caribbean. It is found in Belize, Colombia, Cuba, Dominican Republic, El Salvador, Guatemala, Haiti, Jamaica, the Leeward Islands, Nicaragua, Puerto Rico and the Windward Islands.

It was first described and published in Voy. Uranie on page 503 in 1830.

== Known species ==
According to Kew:

- Rousselia cubensis Grudz.
- Rousselia erratica Standl. & Steyerm.
- Rousselia humilis (Sw.) Urb.
- Rousselia impariflora Grudz.
