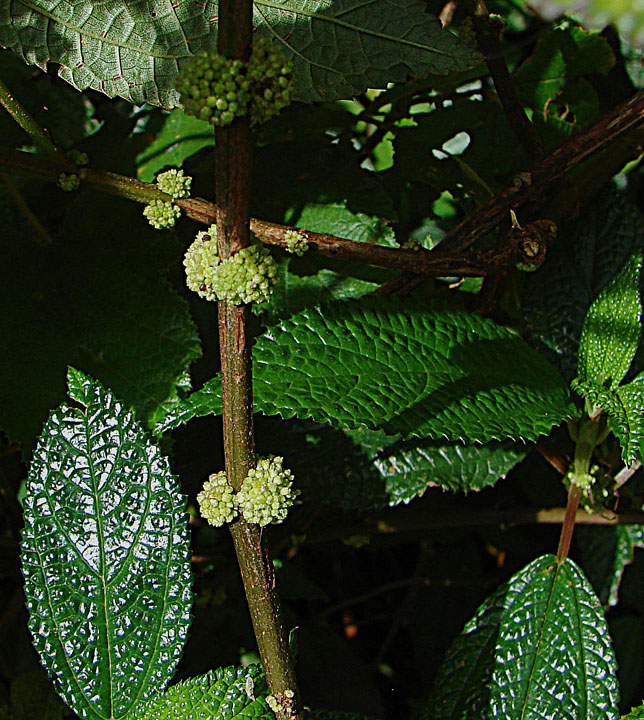
- Cypholophus

Scientific classification
- Kingdom: Plantae
- Clade: Tracheophytes
- Clade: Angiosperms
- Clade: Eudicots
- Clade: Rosids
- Order: Rosales
- Family: Urticaceae
- Tribe: Boehmerieae
- Genus: Cypholophus; Wedd.

= Cypholophus =

Genus of flowering plants

Cypholophus is a genus of flowering plants belonging to the family Urticaceae.

Its native range is Malesia to Southern Pacific.

Species:

- Cypholophus anisoneurus (Guillaumin) Friis & Wilmot-Dear
- Cypholophus brunneolus Elmer
- Cypholophus caeruleus (Blume) Wedd.
- Cypholophus chamaephyton H.J.P.Winkl.
- Cypholophus decipiens H.J.P.Winkl.
- Cypholophus ellipticus Wedd.
- Cypholophus englerianus H.J.P.Winkl.
- Cypholophus friesianus (K.Schum.) H.J.P.Winkl.
- Cypholophus gjellerupii H.J.P.Winkl.
- Cypholophus integer H.J.P.Winkl.
- Cypholophus kerewensis P.Royen
- Cypholophus latifolius (Blume) Wedd.
- Cypholophus ledermannii H.J.P.Winkl.
- Cypholophus lutescens (Blume) Wedd.
- Cypholophus macrocephalus (Blume) Wedd.
- Cypholophus melanocarpoides H.J.P.Winkl.
- Cypholophus melanocarpus (Blume) Miq.
- Cypholophus microphyllus Elmer
- Cypholophus montanus Ridl.
- Cypholophus nummularis H.J.P.Winkl.
- Cypholophus pachycarpus H.J.P.Winkl.
- Cypholophus patens H.J.P.Winkl.
- Cypholophus prostratus (Blume) Miq.
- Cypholophus pulleanus H.J.P.Winkl.
- Cypholophus radicans H.J.P.Winkl.
- Cypholophus reticulatus H.J.P.Winkl.
- Cypholophus rotundifolius H.J.P.Winkl.
- Cypholophus rudis Ridl.
- Cypholophus stipulatus Hochr.
- Cypholophus trapula H.J.P.Winkl.
- Cypholophus treubii H.J.P.Winkl.
- Cypholophus vaccinioides H.J.P.Winkl.
- Cypholophus velutinus H.J.P.Winkl.
- Cypholophus vestitus (Blume) Miq.
- Cypholophus warburgianus Lauterb.
