= Chamabainia =

Scientific classification
- Kingdom: Plantae
- Clade: Tracheophytes
- Clade: Angiosperms
- Clade: Eudicots
- Clade: Rosids
- Order: Rosales
- Family: Urticaceae
- Genus: Chamabainia; Wight

Genus of flowering plants

Chamabainia is a genus of flowering plants belonging to the family Urticaceae.

== Distribution ==
Its native range is Tropical and Subtropical Asia.

== Species ==
Species:

- Chamabainia cuspidata Wight
