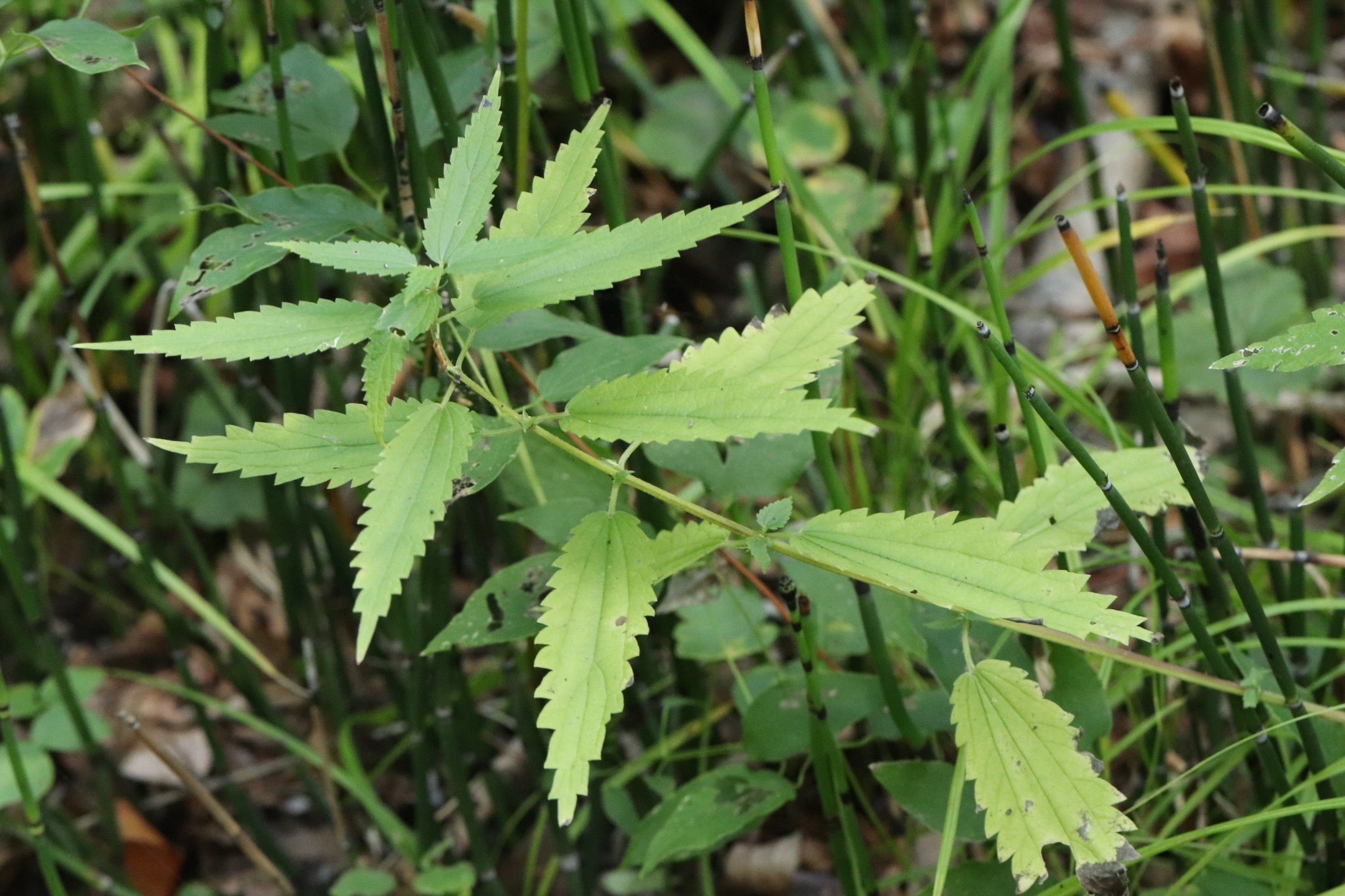

Scientific classification
- Kingdom: Plantae
- Clade: Tracheophytes
- Clade: Angiosperms
- Clade: Eudicots
- Clade: Rosids
- Order: Rosales
- Family: Urticaceae
- Genus: Urtica
- Species: U. angustifolia

Binomial name
- Urtica angustifolia Fisch. ex Hornem.

= Urtica angustifolia =

Species of plant

Urtica angustifolia also commonly called the East-Asian nettle is a species of plant in the family Urticaceae. POWO lists is as a synonym of Urtica dioica var. holosericea.

== Description ==
Urtica angustifolia is a perennial plant that grows up to 1.5 meters. It flowers from June to August and seeds ripen from August to October.

== Distribution and habitat ==
Urtica angustifolia is native to Hebei, Heilongjiang, Jilin, Liaoning, Inner Mongolia, Shandong, Shanxi, Japan, Mongolia, Korea, Russia (Russian Far East, Siberia). It grows in moist places in forests, thickets, steam banks.

== Gallery ==
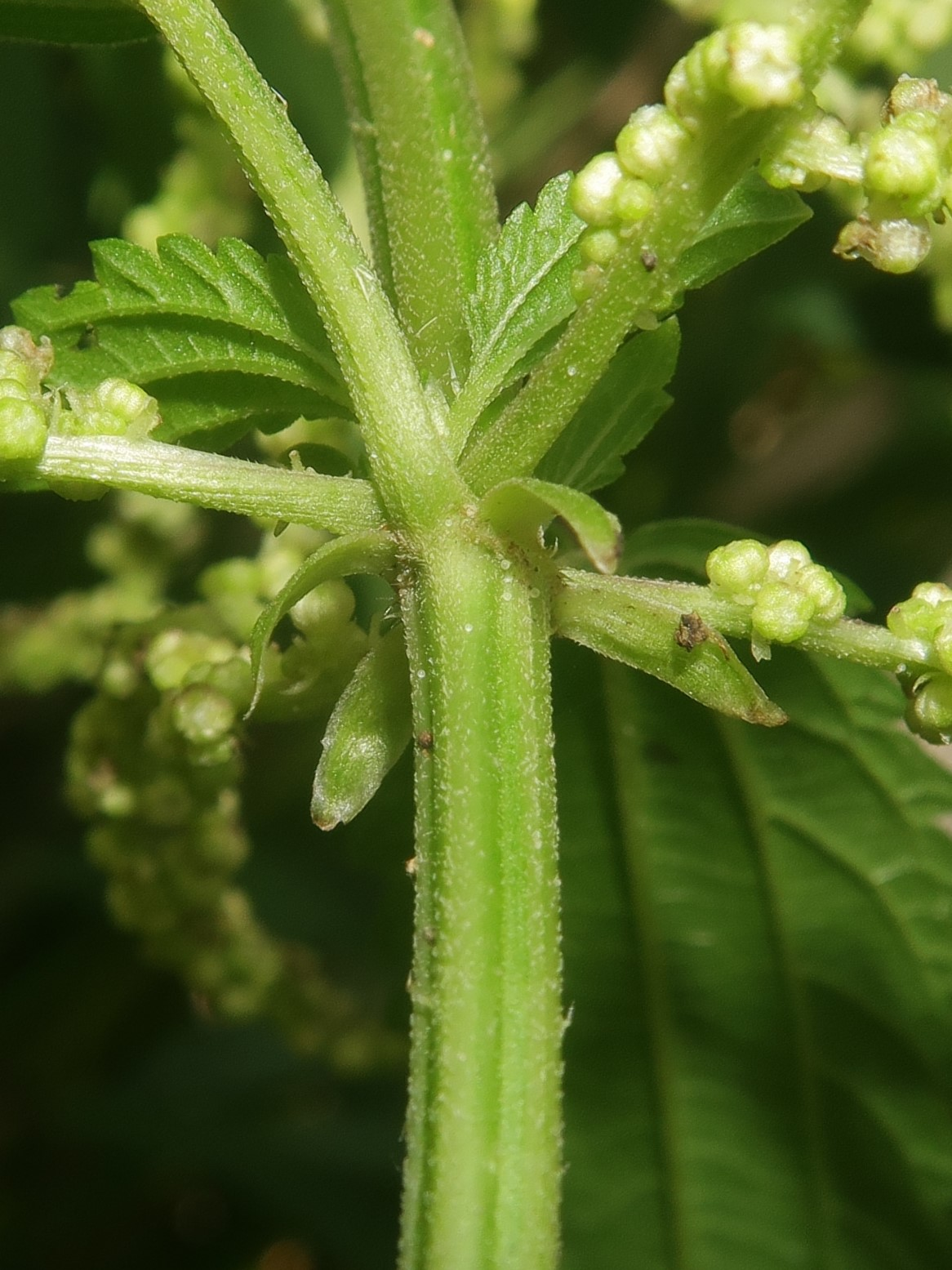
Stem of Urtica angustifolia

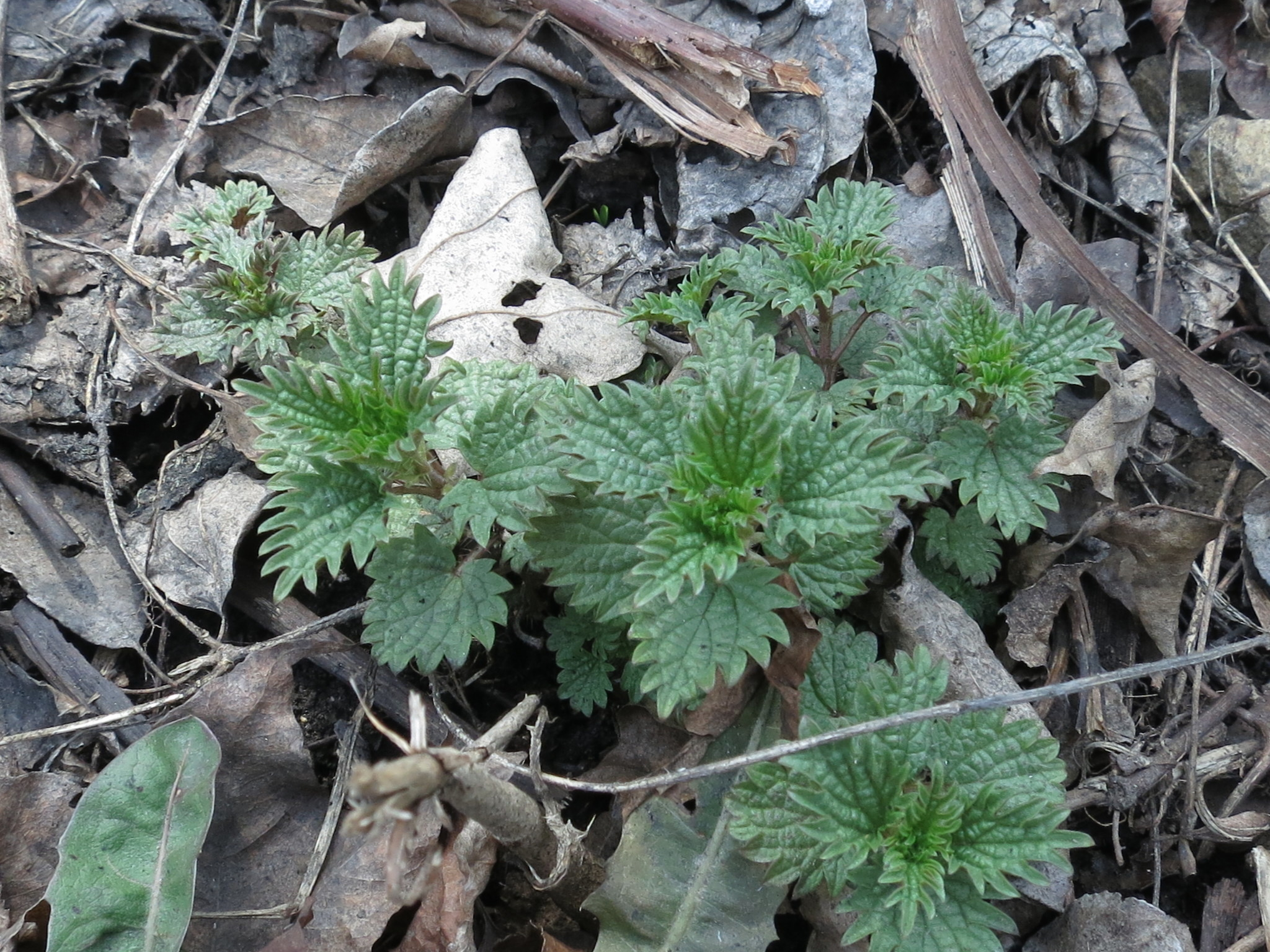
Young Urtica angustifolia
