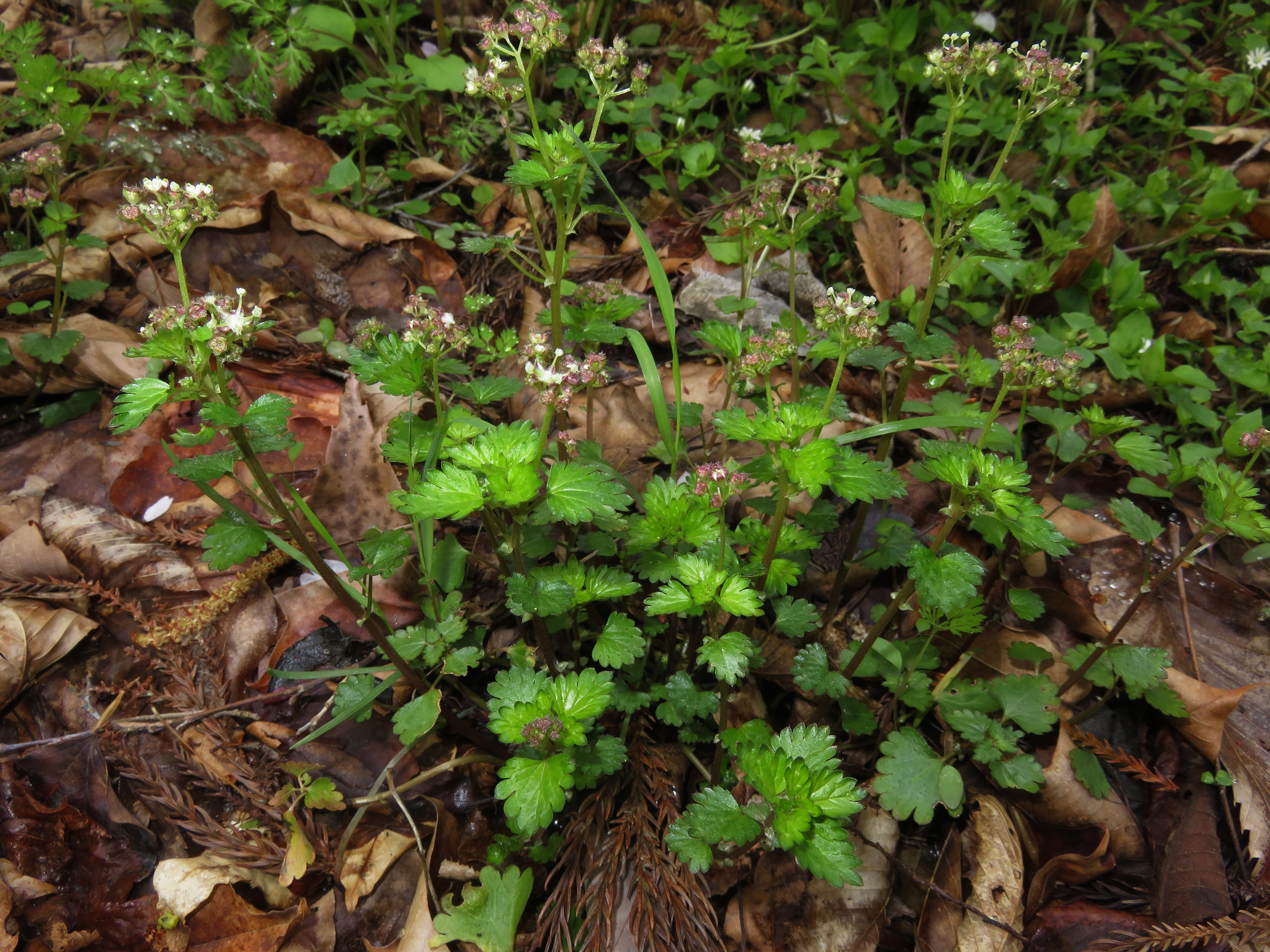
- Nanocnide japonica

Scientific classification
- Kingdom: Plantae
- Clade: Tracheophytes
- Clade: Angiosperms
- Clade: Eudicots
- Clade: Rosids
- Order: Rosales
- Family: Urticaceae
- Tribe: Urticeae
- Genus: Nanocnide; Blume

= Nanocnide =

Genus of plants

Nanocnide is a genus of flowering plants belonging to the family Urticaceae.

Its native range is Central and Southern China to Vietnam, Temperate Eastern Asia.

Species:

- Nanocnide japonica Blume
- Nanocnide lobata Wedd.
- Nanocnide zhejiangensis X.F.Jin & Y.F.Lu
