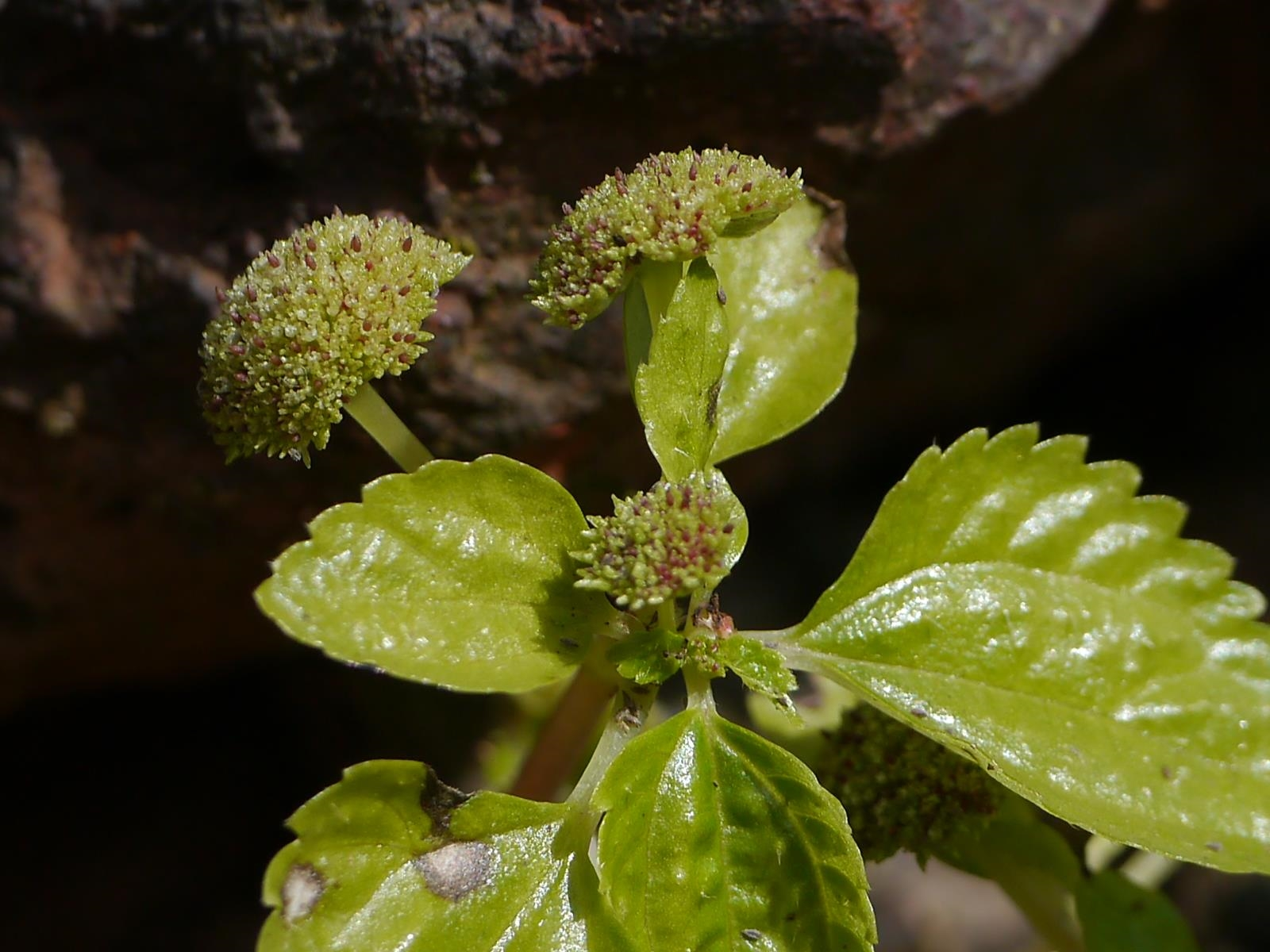
- Lecanthus peduncularis

Scientific classification
- Kingdom: Plantae
- Clade: Tracheophytes
- Clade: Angiosperms
- Clade: Eudicots
- Clade: Rosids
- Order: Rosales
- Family: Urticaceae
- Tribe: Elatostemateae
- Genus: Lecanthus; Wedd. (1854)

Synonyms
- Meniscogyne Gagnep. (1928)

= Lecanthus =

Genus of plants

Lecanthus is a genus of flowering plants belonging to the family Urticaceae. Its native range is tropical Africa, tropical and subtropical Asia to southwestern Pacific.

== Species ==
Four species are accepted.

- Lecanthus obtusus (Royle) Hand.-Mazz.
- Lecanthus peduncularis (Royle) Wedd.
- Lecanthus petelotii (Gagnep.) C.J.Chen
- Lecanthus pileoides S.S.Chien & C.J.Chen
