= Discocnide =

Scientific classification
- Kingdom: Plantae
- Clade: Tracheophytes
- Clade: Angiosperms
- Clade: Eudicots
- Clade: Rosids
- Order: Rosales
- Family: Urticaceae
- Tribe: Urticeae
- Genus: Discocnide; Chew
- Species: D. mexicana

Binomial name
- Discocnide mexicana (Liebm.) Chew

Monotypic genus of plants

Discocnide is a monotypic genus of flowering plants belonging to the family Urticaceae. The only species is Discocnide mexicana.

Its native range is Mexico to Central America.
