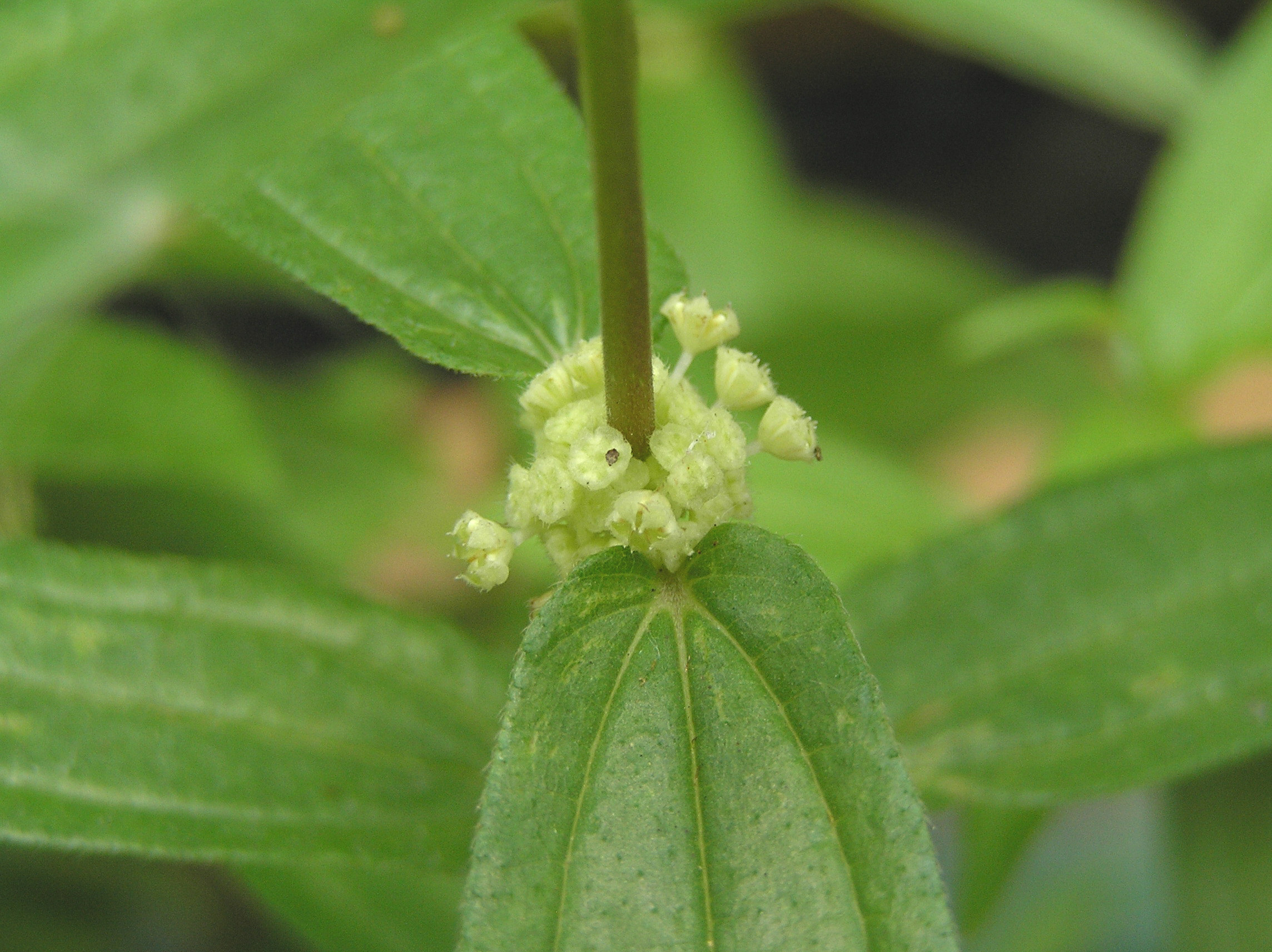
- Gonostegia hirta

Scientific classification
- Kingdom: Plantae
- Clade: Tracheophytes
- Clade: Angiosperms
- Clade: Eudicots
- Clade: Rosids
- Order: Rosales
- Family: Urticaceae
- Tribe: Boehmerieae
- Genus: Gonostegia; Turcz.

Synonyms
- Hyrtanandra Miq.

= Gonostegia =

Genus of plants

Gonostegia is a genus of flowering plants belonging to the family Urticaceae.

Its native range is from tropical and subtropical Asia to northern Australia.

== Species ==
The following species are recognised in the genus Gonostegia:

- Gonostegia bennettiana (Wight) Pusalkar & Ingle
- Gonostegia caudata (Benn.) Miq.
- Gonostegia gardneri (Wight) Pusalkar & Ingle
- Gonostegia gracilis (Miq.) Miq.
- Gonostegia hirta (Blume) Miq.
- Gonostegia integrifolia (Dalzell) Miq.
- Gonostegia lawsoniana (C.E.C Fisch.) Pusalkar & Ingle
- Gonostegia meeboldii (W.W.Sm. & Ramaswami) Pusalkar & Ingle
- Gonostegia parvifolia (Wight) Miq.
- Gonostegia pentandra (Roxb.) Miq.
- Gonostegia wightii (Benn.) Pusalkar & Ingle
