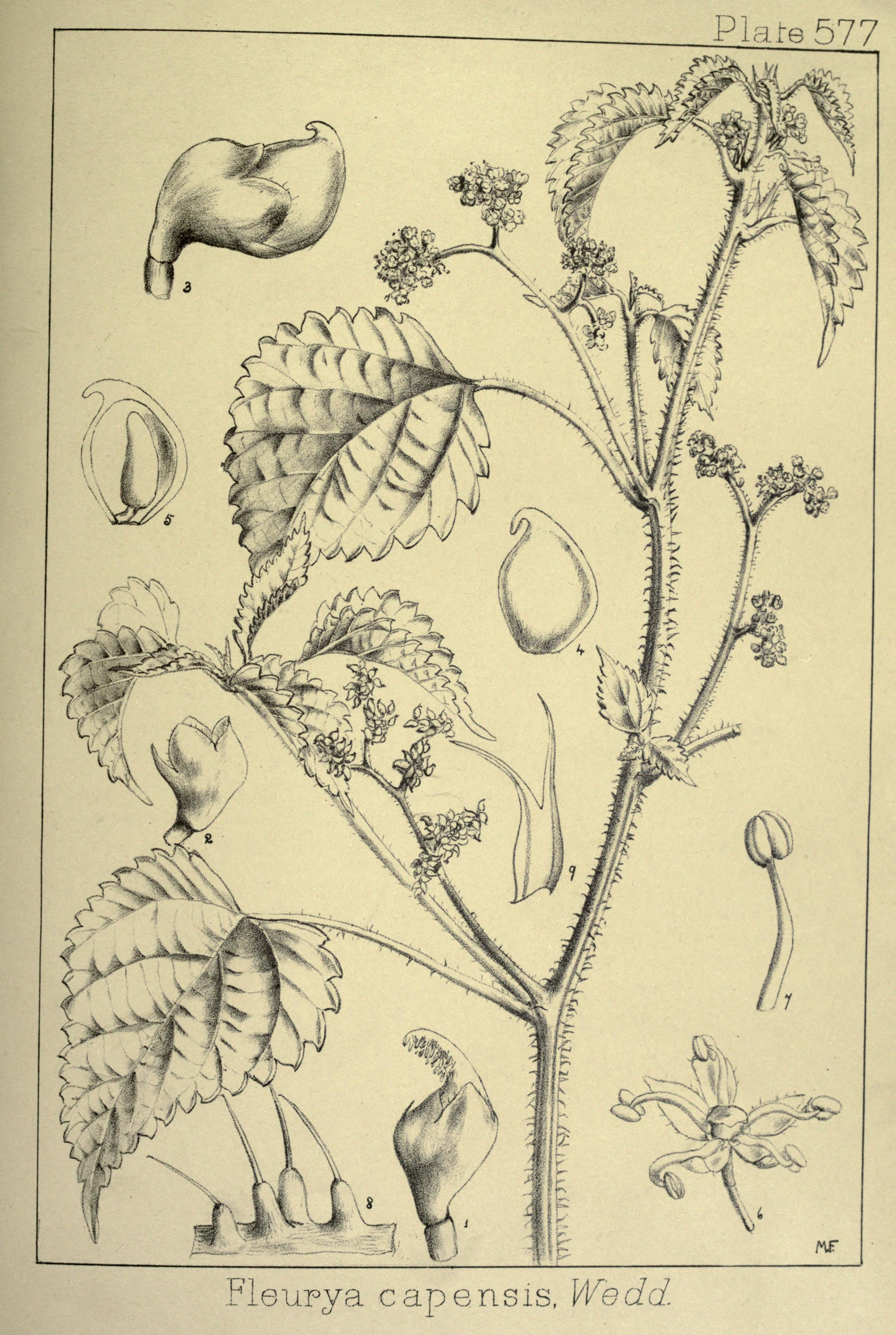
- Didymodoxa capensis as Fleurya capensis.

Scientific classification
- Kingdom: Plantae
- Clade: Tracheophytes
- Clade: Angiosperms
- Clade: Eudicots
- Clade: Rosids
- Order: Rosales
- Family: Urticaceae
- Genus: Didymodoxa; E.Mey. ex Wedd.

= Didymodoxa =

Genus of plants

Didymodoxa is a genus of flowering plants belonging to the family Urticaceae.

Its native range is Eritrea to Southern Africa.

Species:

- Didymodoxa caffra (Thunb.) Friis & Wilmot-Dear
- Didymodoxa capensis (L.f.) Friis & Wilmot-Dear
