= Myriocarpa =

- Myriocarpa longipes

Scientific classification
- Kingdom: Plantae
- Clade: Tracheophytes
- Clade: Angiosperms
- Clade: Eudicots
- Clade: Rosids
- Order: Rosales
- Family: Urticaceae
- Tribe: Elatostemateae
- Genus: Myriocarpa; Benth.

Genus of flowering plants

Myriocarpa is a genus of woody plants in the family Urticaceae. Species in the genus range in size from shrubs to small trees and are endemic to Central and South America. Myriocarpa is characterized by long pendulous string-like female inflorescences of apparently naked flowers and stems which release a watery latex when cut. Estimates for the diversity of the genus range from five to eighteen species. Research for Flora Mesoamericana indicates that there are probably fifteen to twenty species.

The genus was described by George Bentham in 1846 based on Colombian specimens of Myriocarpa stipitata collected by Mss. Barclay. Weddell placed Myriocarpa in the Urticaceae tribe Boehmerieae despite its anomalous pubescence, cystolith morphology and wood anatomy. In his review of the Urticaceae, Friis retained its position within the Boehmerieae, presumably because its position in any other Urticaceae tribe would be equally ambiguous. The position of Myriocarpa within the Boehmerieae is not supported by recent phylogenetic analyses of trnL-F sequence data that recovered Myriocarpa within a strongly supported clade including both the Urticeae and Lecantheae tribes.

Its position within either one of these tribes however, is unresolved. Based on hair, leaf and flower morphology, Myriocarpa could equally well be placed in the Lecantheae (absence of hooked hairs) or the Urticeae (alternate leaves, pistillodes not ejecting the achene) and further research, both molecular and morphological, is warranted.

The last major revision of the genus, at which time six species were recognized, was that of Hugh Algernon Weddell. Since this revision Myriocarpa has attracted little taxonomic interest outside of floristic treatments, despite its unusual female inflorescence morphology and ambiguous position within the Urticaceae and currently a total of 24 species names have been published.
