= Hemistylus (plant) =

Scientific classification
- Kingdom: Plantae
- Clade: Embryophytes
- Clade: Tracheophytes
- Clade: Spermatophytes
- Clade: Angiosperms
- Clade: Eudicots
- Clade: Rosids
- Order: Rosales
- Family: Urticaceae
- Tribe: Boehmerieae
- Genus: Hemistylus; Benth.

Genus of plants

Hemistylus is a genus of flowering plants belonging to the family Urticaceae.

Its native range is Brazil, Colombia, Ecuador, south-eastern Mexico and Venezuela.

Species:

- Hemistylus boehmerioides Benth.
- Hemistylus macrostachya Wedd.
- Hemistylus odontophylla Wedd.
- Hemistylus velutina Wedd.
