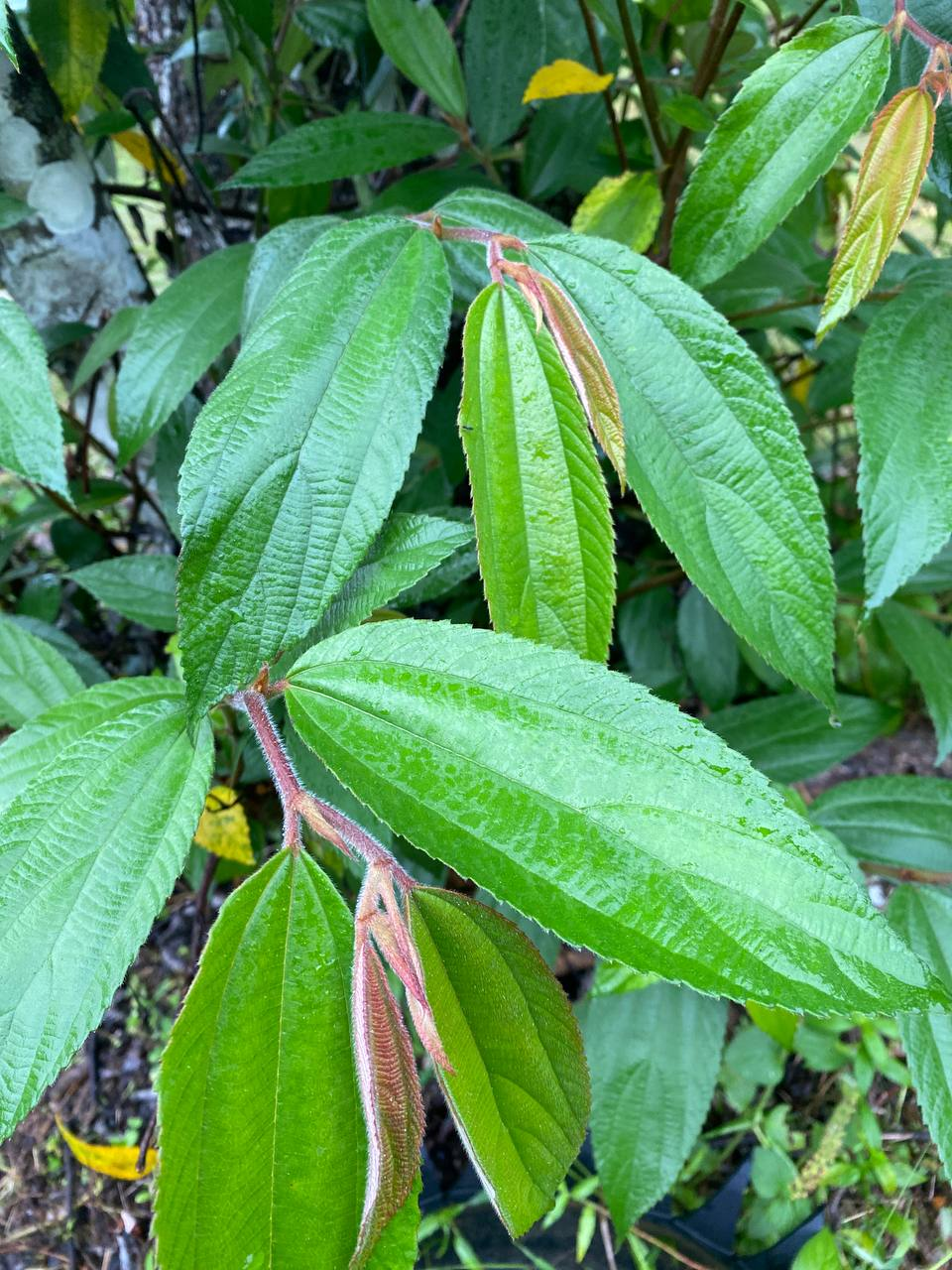
- Leucosyke capitellata

Scientific classification
- Kingdom: Plantae
- Clade: Tracheophytes
- Clade: Angiosperms
- Clade: Eudicots
- Clade: Rosids
- Order: Rosales
- Family: Urticaceae
- Tribe: Cecropieae
- Genus: Leucosyke; Zoll. & Moritzi

= Leucosyke =

Genus of plants

Leucosyke is a genus of flowering plants belonging to the family Urticaceae.

It is native to tropical and subtropical Asia and the southern Pacific.

== Species ==
The following species are recognised in the genus Leucosyke:

- Leucosyke arcuatovenosa Unruh
- Leucosyke aspera C.B.Rob.
- Leucosyke benguetensis Unruh
- Leucosyke bornensis (Blume) Miq.
- Leucosyke brunnescens C.B.Rob.
- Leucosyke buderi Unruh
- Leucosyke capitellata (Poir.) Wedd.
- Leucosyke caudata Unruh
- Leucosyke celebica (Blume) Miq.
- Leucosyke clemensii Unruh
- Leucosyke corymbulosa (Wedd.) Wedd.
- Leucosyke elmeri Unruh
- Leucosyke forbesii Unruh
- Leucosyke hispidissima (Wedd.) Miq.
- Leucosyke javanica Zoll. & Moritzi
- Leucosyke kjellbergii Unruh
- Leucosyke media Unruh
- Leucosyke mindorensis C.B.Rob.
- Leucosyke montana H.J.P.Winkl.
- Leucosyke negrosensis C.B.Rob.
- Leucosyke nivea C.B.Rob.
- Leucosyke ochroneura (Blume) Wedd.
- Leucosyke ovalifolia C.B.Rob.
- Leucosyke pulchra (Ridl.) H.J.P.Winkl.
- Leucosyke puya (Hook.) den Baaker & Mabb.
- Leucosyke quadrinervia C.B.Rob.
- Leucosyke rizalensis Unruh
- Leucosyke rubiginosa Miq.
- Leucosyke salomonensis Unruh
- Leucosyke sumatrana Miq.
- Leucosyke superfluens Unruh
- Leucosyke weddellii Unruh
- Leucosyke winkleri-huberti Unruh
