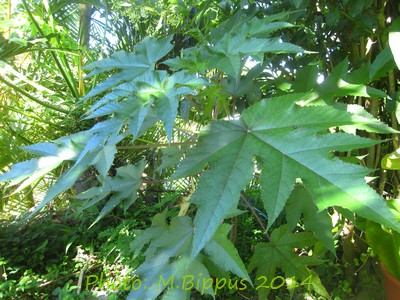
- Obetia ficifolia

Scientific classification
- Kingdom: Plantae
- Clade: Tracheophytes
- Clade: Angiosperms
- Clade: Eudicots
- Clade: Rosids
- Order: Rosales
- Family: Urticaceae
- Tribe: Urticeae
- Genus: Obetia; Gaudich.

Type species
- Obetia ficifolia Gaudich.

= Obetia =

Genus of flowering plants

Obetia is a genus of dioecious plants in the family Urticaceae, with stinging hairs. The genus contains the following species:

- Obetia carruthersiana (Hiern) Rendle
- Obetia ficifolia Gaudich.
- Obetia madagascariensis (Juss. ex Poir.) Wedd.
- Obetia radula (Baker) Baker ex B.D. Jacks. stinging-nettle tree
- Obetia tenax Friis
