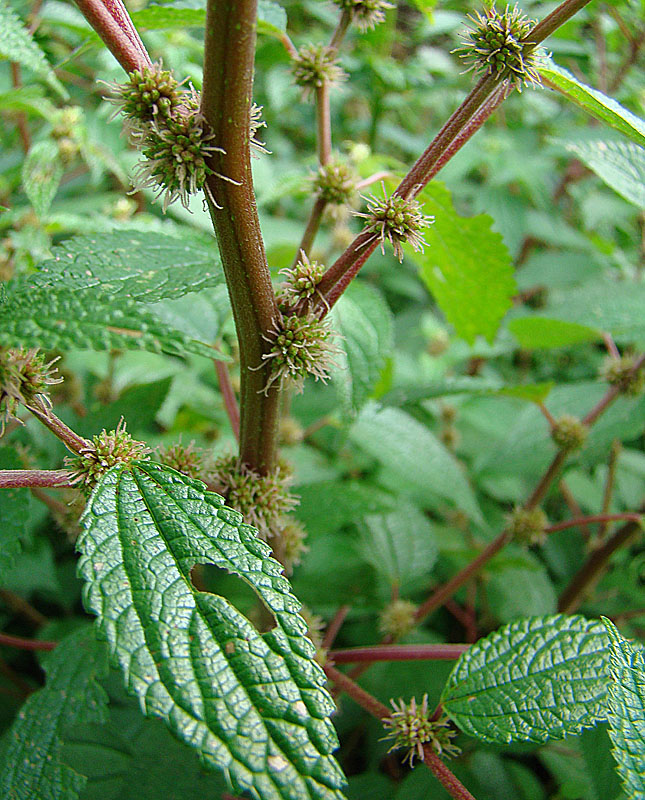
- Phenax rugosus

Scientific classification
- Kingdom: Plantae
- Clade: Embryophytes
- Clade: Tracheophytes
- Clade: Spermatophytes
- Clade: Angiosperms
- Clade: Eudicots
- Clade: Rosids
- Order: Rosales
- Family: Urticaceae
- Tribe: Boehmerieae
- Genus: Phenax; Wedd.

= Phenax (plant) =

Genus of plants

Phenax is a genus of flowering plants belonging to the family Urticaceae. Its native range is Mexico to Tropical America.

== Species ==
Species:

- Phenax angustifolius (Kunth) Wedd.
- Phenax asper Wedd.
- Phenax bullatus Rusby
- Phenax ekmanii Urb.
- Phenax erectus Urb.
- Phenax flavifolius Rusby
- Phenax globulifera Rusby
- Phenax granulatus Urb.
- Phenax grossecrenatus Killip
- Phenax haitensis Wedd.
- Phenax hirtus (Sw.) Wedd.
- Phenax integrifolius Wedd.
- Phenax laevigatus Wedd.
- Phenax laevis Urb. & Ekman
- Phenax laxiflorus Wedd.
- Phenax madagascariensis Leandri
- Phenax mexicanus Wedd.
- Phenax microcarpus Urb.
- Phenax microphyllus Urb.
- Phenax pauciflorus Urb.
- Phenax pauciserratus (Wedd.) Rusby
- Phenax perrieri Leandri
- Phenax poiretii Alain
- Phenax rugosus (Poir.) Wedd.
- Phenax sessilifolius Urb. & Ekman
- Phenax sonneratii (Poir.) Wedd.
- Phenax uliginosus Wedd.
- Phenax weddellianus Killip
