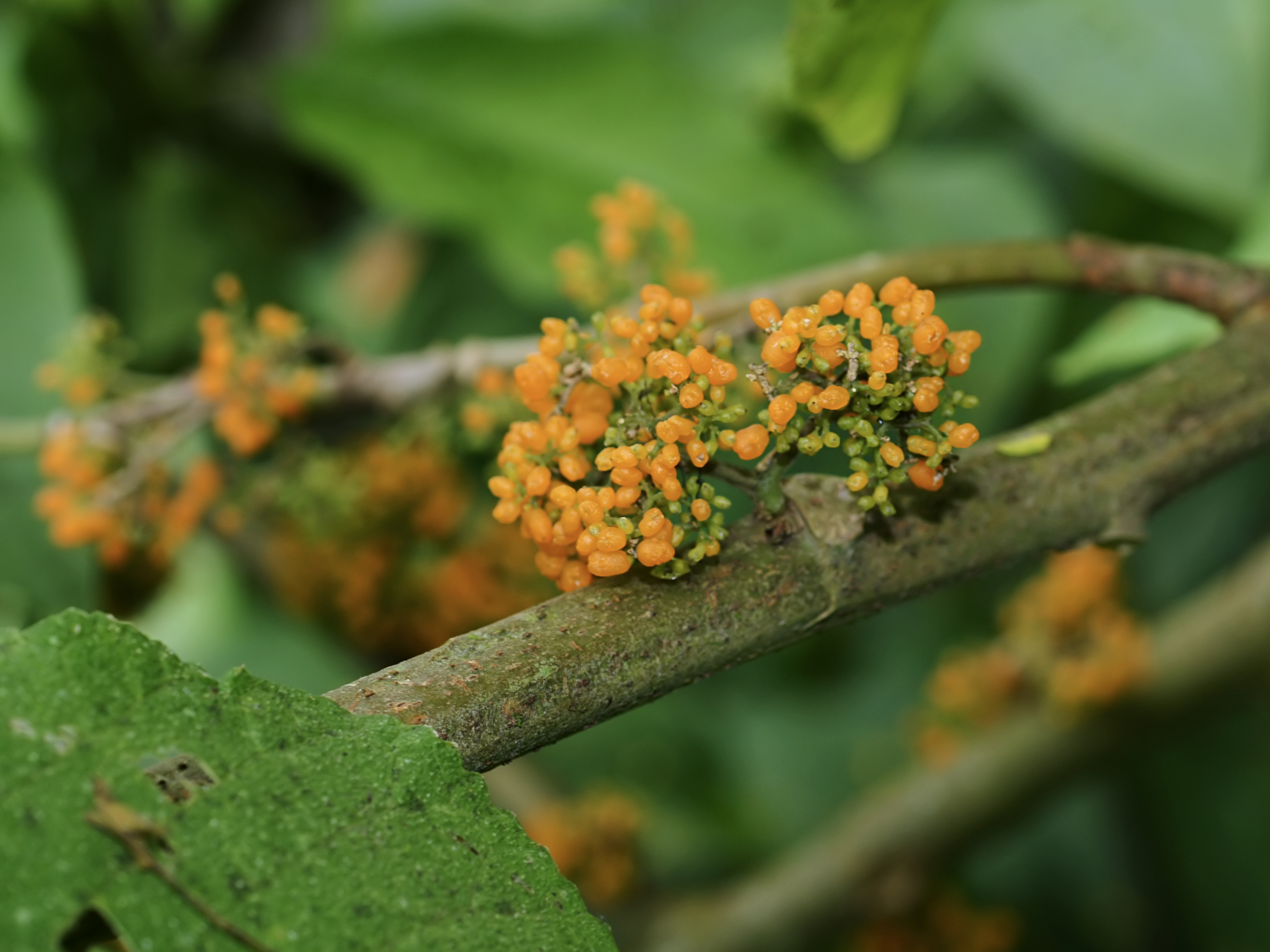
- Urera simplex

Scientific classification
- Kingdom: Plantae
- Clade: Tracheophytes
- Clade: Angiosperms
- Clade: Eudicots
- Clade: Rosids
- Order: Rosales
- Family: Urticaceae
- Tribe: Urticeae
- Genus: Urera; Gaudich. (1830)

Species
- 28; see text

Synonyms
- Calostima Raf. (1837)

= Urera =

Genus of flowering plants

Urera is a genus of flowering plants in the nettle family, Urticaceae. It has a pantropical distribution.

== Description ==
Urera are lianas, shrubs, and small trees. Climbing species root along the stems and can reach the crowns of the trees they use for support. Some are spiny. They almost always have urticating hairs, often on bumps in the epidermis. These are stiff, stinging trichomes with swollen bases. The leaves are variable in shape and venation, and help in the identification of species. Also useful is the varying appearance and arrangement of cystoliths on the leaf surface. The inflorescence is a divided, branching panicle of flowers. Most species are dioecious, but a few are monoecious. Most species have male flowers with either four or five stamens and tepals. Female flowers generally have four uneven, free to mostly fused tepals. The fruit is an achene covered in orange or red flesh.

== Systematics and taxonomy ==
The genus Urera was first described by Charles Gaudichaud-Beaupré in 1826 in his review of the studies done on Louis de Freycinet's voyage of the Uranie. He noted its distinctness, proposing the subtribe Urereae. This was later raised to the rank of tribe, and subsequently merged into Urticeae.

No botanical monographs have been devoted to Urera since 1869. Knowledge of the systematics of the genus has accumulated mainly from new descriptions of species and floristic accounts.

About 113 species epithets have been published for the genus. Plants of the World Online currently accepts 28 species. Many species have been transferred to other genera, including Boehmeria, Dendrocnide, Girardinia, Gyrotaenia, Laportea, Obetia, and Scepocarpus. Other estimates for the number of valid species in Urera range up to 75. The genus is not well known, with current knowledge dependent mainly on outdated studies, and there is little agreement regarding its taxonomy.

Analysis of trnL-F chloroplast DNA sequence data suggests that Urera could be sister to Poikilospermum within the Urticaceae.

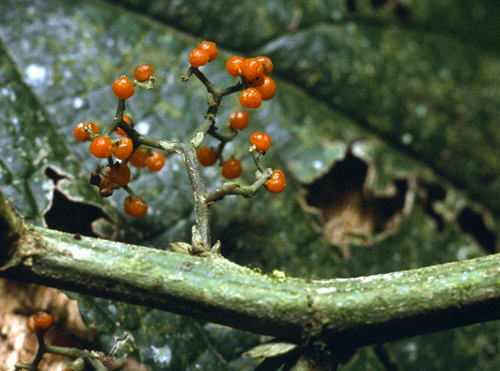
Urera caracasana fruits

=== Species ===
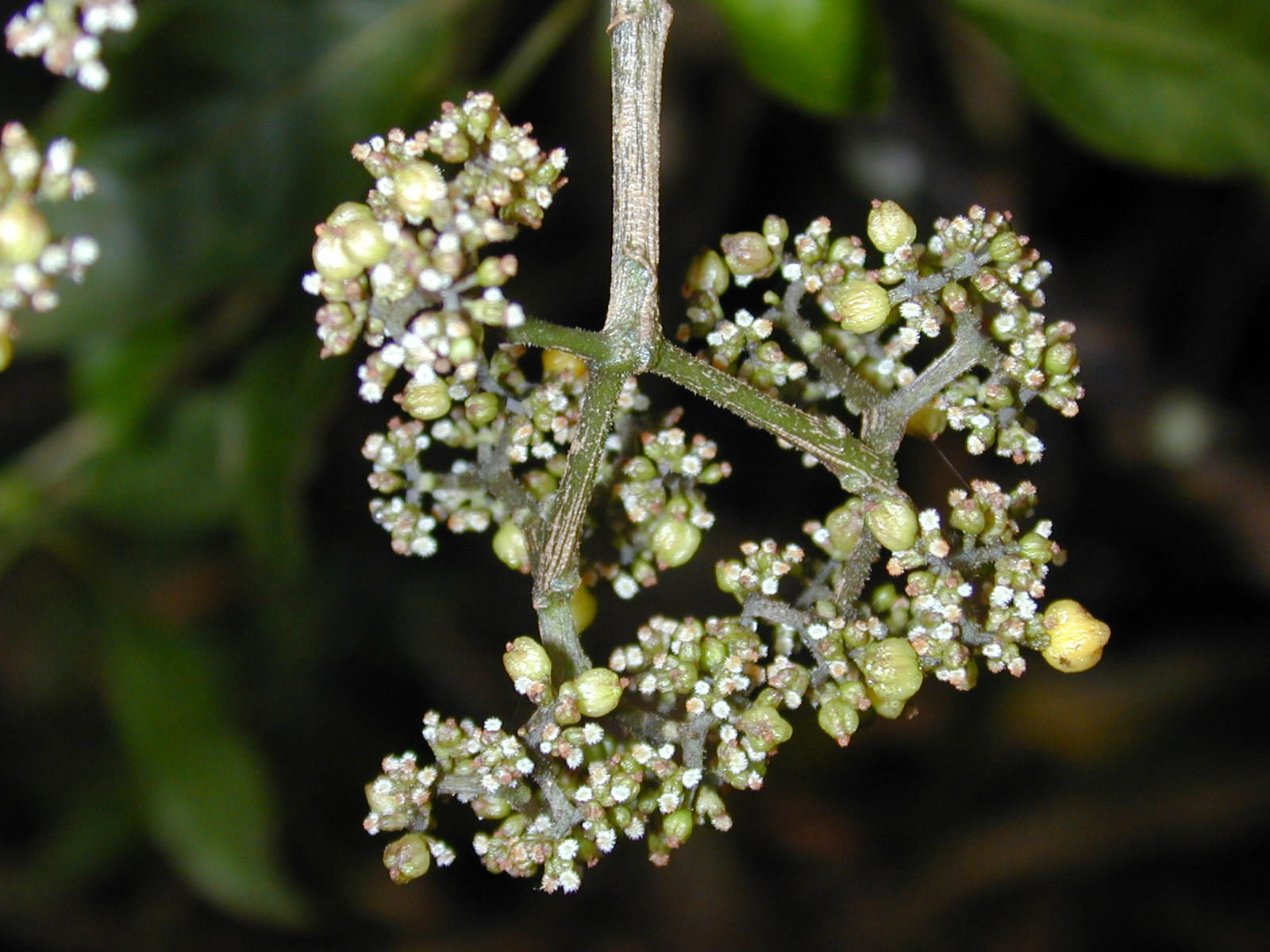
Urera glabra

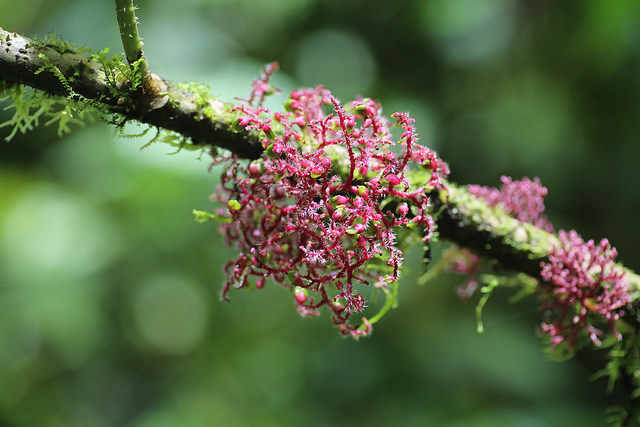
Urera baccifera

28 species are accepted.

- Urera acuminata (Poir.) Gaudich. ex Decne.
- Urera altissima Lillo
- Urera aurantiaca Wedd.
- Urera baccifera (L.) Gaudich. ex Wedd., 1852 – guaritoto, scratchbush
- Urera capitata Wedd.
- Urera caracasana (Jacq.) Gaudich. ex Griseb. – flameberry
- Urera elata (Sw.) Griseb.
- Urera expansa (Sw.) Griseb.
- Urera fenestrata A.K.Monro & Al.Rodr.
- Urera filiformis Rusby
- Urera glabriuscula V.W.Steinm.
- Urera gravenreuthii Engl.
- Urera guanacastensis A.K.Monro & Al.Rodr.
- Urera kaalae Wawra – Opuhe (Oʻahu in Hawaii)
- Urera keayi Letouzey
- Urera killipiana Standl. & Steyerm.
- Urera laciniata Wedd.
- Urera lianoides A.K.Monro & Al.Rodr.
- Urera lobulata Urb. & Ekman
- Urera martiniana V.W.Steinm.
- Urera nitida (Vell.) P.Brack
- Urera pacifica V.W.Steinm.
- Urera simplex Wedd.
- Urera talbotii Rendle
- Urera verrucosa (Liebm.) V.W.Steinm. – chichicastle, mala mujer

=== Formerly placed here ===
- Touchardia sandwicensis (Wedd.) ined. – hopue, Ōpuhe (Hawaii) (as Urera sandwicensis Wedd., U. glabra (Hook. & Arn.) Wedd., and U. konaensis H.St.John)
