= A. angolanus =

A. angolanus may refer to:

- Abacetus angolanus, an Angolan ground beetle
- Acraea angolanus, a synonym of Acraea oreas, the black-and-white acraea, an African butterfly
