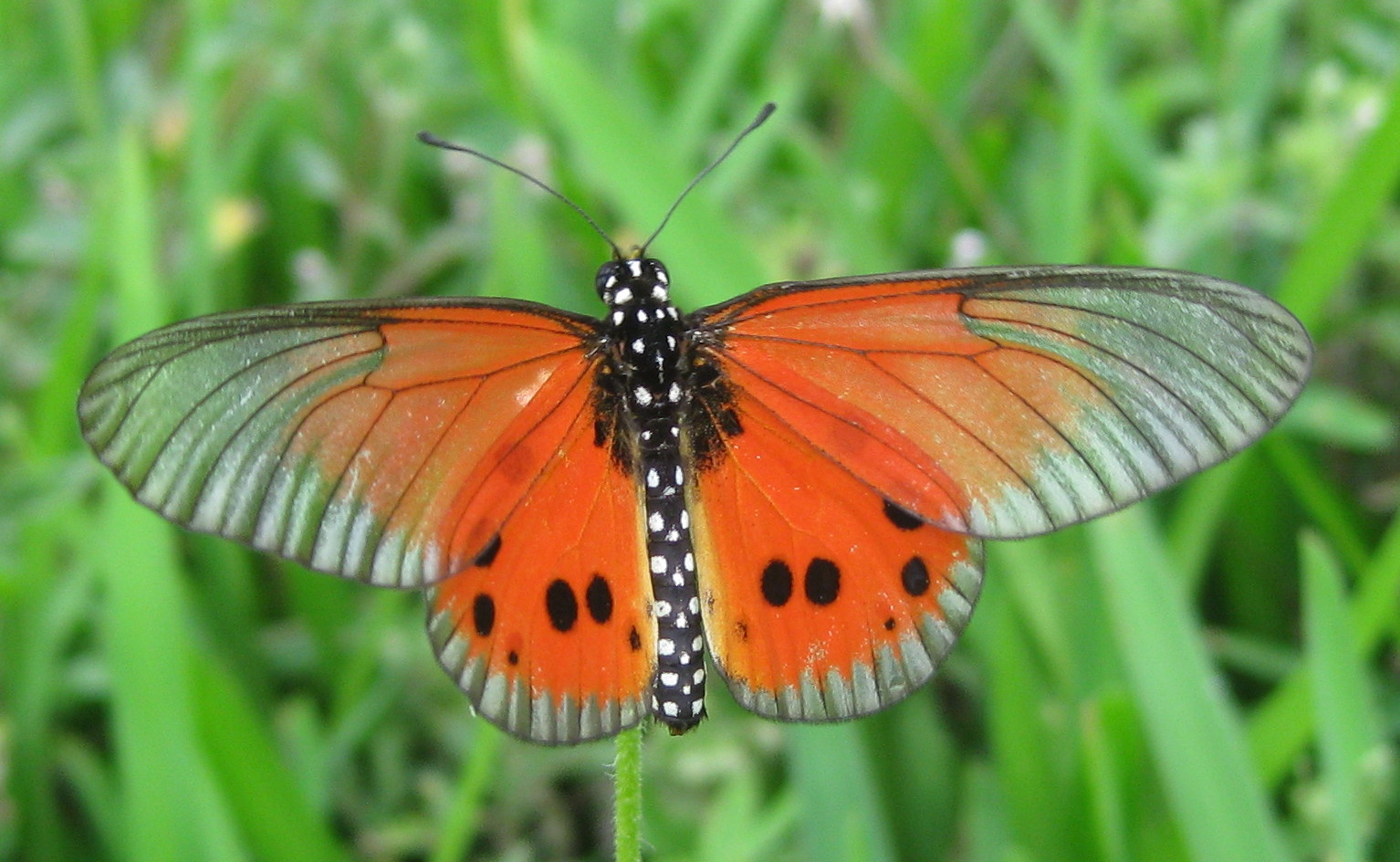

Scientific classification
- Kingdom: Animalia
- Phylum: Arthropoda
- Clade: Pancrustacea
- Class: Insecta
- Order: Lepidoptera
- Family: Nymphalidae
- Genus: Acraea
- Species: A. igola

Binomial name
- Acraea igola Trimen, 1889

Synonyms
- Telchinia igola (Trimen, 1889); Hyalites igola (Trimen, 1889); Acraea maculiventris Grose-Smith and Kirby, 1894; Acraea igola f. turbata Le Doux, 1923; Acraea igola f. fasciola Le Doux, 1923

= Acraea igola =

Dusky-veined acraea

Species of butterfly

Acraea igola, the dusky-veined acraea, is a butterfly of the family Nymphalidae. It is found from the Eastern Cape along the coast to KwaZulu-Natal, Zimbabwe, Mozambique, north-eastern Tanzania.

The wingspan is 40–45 mm for males and 45–53 mm for females. Adults are on wing year round, with a peak from October to April. It is very scarce in dry months.

== Description ==
A. igola Trim, is very similar to the two preceding species, [ A. quirinalis, A. orestia ] but the marginal band of the hindwing is not transparent and the cell is unspotted. Basal half of the forewing as far as the apex of the cell and vein 3 bright orange-yellow without spots; costal margin dusted with black to the base, apex, marginal band and veins 3–6; cellules 3-6 otherwise diaphanous; hindwing orange-yellow above with black dots and black marginal band 2-2.5 mm. in breadth; the red-yellow colour on the under surface much paler than on the upper; streaks on the interneural folds short, not reaching the distal margin. In the female the ground-colour is lighter, light ochre-yellow to cream-yellow and the marginal band not sharply defined. Zululand to German East Africa. - female f. maculiventris Sm. & Kirby has a duller, more brown-yellow ground-colour and the marginal band on the upperside of the hindwing not sharply defined, sometimes broader, sometimes narrower; beneath the hindwing is sometimes coloured as above, sometimes chocolate-brown at the base as far as the discal spots, and then light reddish to the red-brown marginal band. Among the type-form.

== Biology ==
The larvae feed on Urera woodii and Urera trinervis.

== Taxonomy ==
It is a member of the Acraea masamba species group - but see also Pierre & Bernaud, 2014
