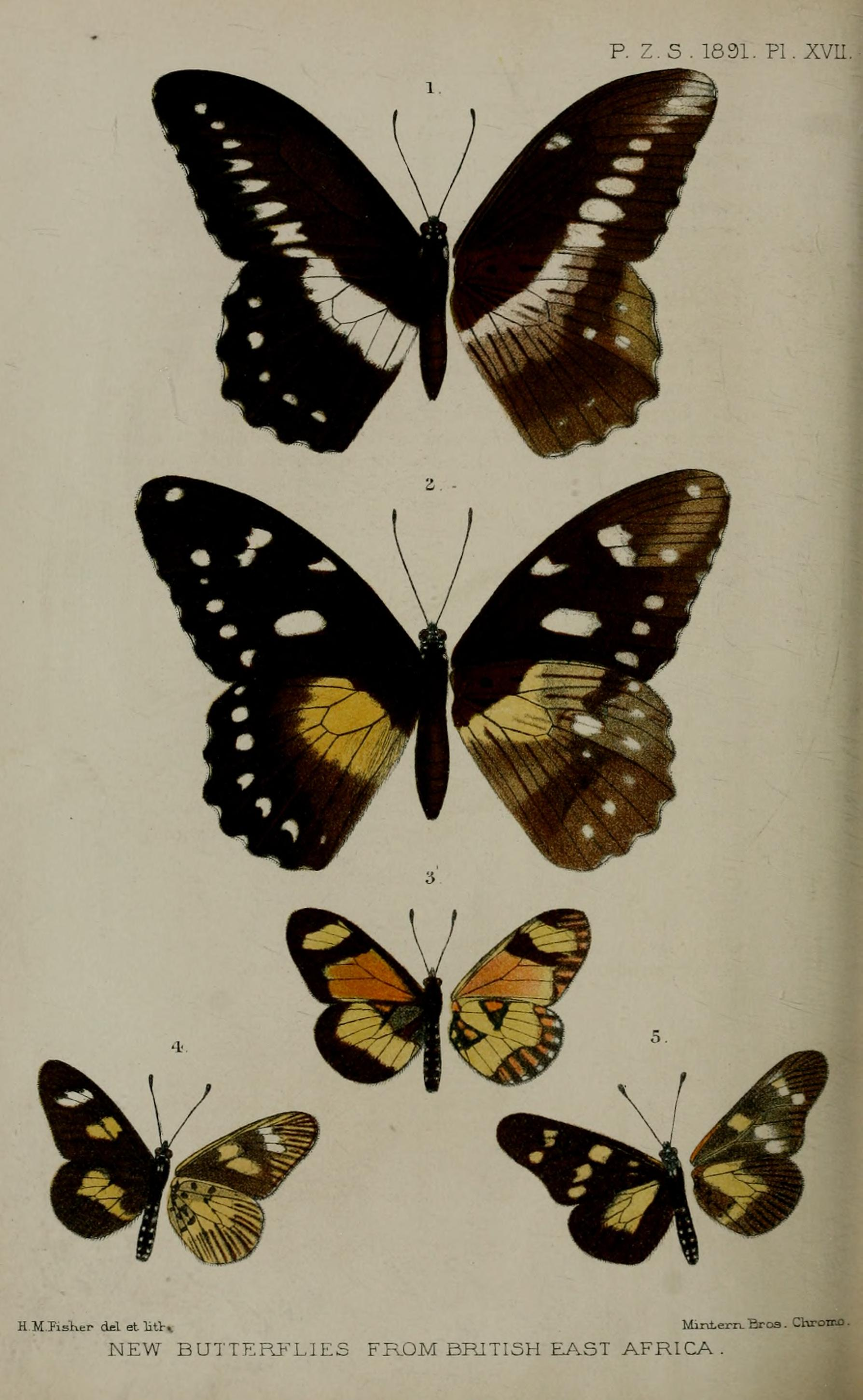
- Figure 5

Scientific classification
- Kingdom: Animalia
- Phylum: Arthropoda
- Class: Insecta
- Order: Lepidoptera
- Family: Nymphalidae
- Genus: Acraea
- Species: A. oreas

Binomial name
- Acraea oreas Sharpe, 1891

Synonyms
- Acraea (Actinote) oreas; Acraea oreas f. albimaculata Neave, 1904; Acraea angolanus Lathy, 1906; Acraea oreas ab. radians Aurivillius, 1913

= Acraea oreas =

Black-and-white acraea

Species of butterfly

Acraea oreas, the black-and-white acraea, is a butterfly in the family Nymphalidae. It is found in Nigeria, Cameroon, Angola, the Democratic Republic of the Congo, Sudan, Uganda, Rwanda, Burundi, Kenya, Tanzania and Zambia.

== Description ==
A. oreas E. Sharpe (57 c). Both wings deep black above, with yellow markings; the forewing spotted quite as in [forma] fallax and confusa, but in addition with a similar spot in the cell; the hindwing with a long but narrow median area, which covers the cell and the base of cellules 2-7, but is proximally bounded by vein 2, thus not nearly reaching the inner margin; the fore wing is somewhat longer and narrower than in johnstoni and lycoa. On the under surface the hindwing and the apical part of the forewing have a rust-brown ground colour with black longitudinal streaks; the light markings almost as above, but the yellow median area of the hindwing emits a branch to or almost to the middle of the inner margin. Angola; German and British East Africa; Uganda, ab. albimaculata Neave. Spots of the forewing white. In the same localities as the type-form. f. angolana Lathy.[ now subspecies ] Marginal band of the hindwing beneath and apical part of the forewing with grey-yellow ground-colour; spots of the forewing white. Angola. female-ab. radians ab. nov. (= angolana female-ab. Lathy) only differs from angolana in the yellow median area of the hindwing above extending in broad rays between the veins nearly to the distal margin; the spots on the upperside of the forewing yellowish. Angola.

== Subspecies ==
- Acraea oreas oreas (Democratic Republic of the Congo: Ituri and northern Kivu, southern Sudan, Uganda, Rwanda, Burundi, Kenya, northern and western Tanzania)
- Acraea oreas angolanus Lathy, 1906 (Angola, Democratic Republic of the Congo: Shaba, northern Zambia)
- Acraea oreas oboti Collins & Larsen, 2000 (Nigeria: Obudu Plateau and Mambilla Plateau, Cameroon)

== Biology ==
The habitat consists of mountainous areas at altitudes between 1,300 and 2,000 metres.

Adults are attracted to damp patches, excrement and rotten meat.

The larvae feed on Urera cordifolia and Morus species.

== Taxonomy ==
It is a member of the Acraea circeis species group- but see also Pierre & Bernaud, 2014
