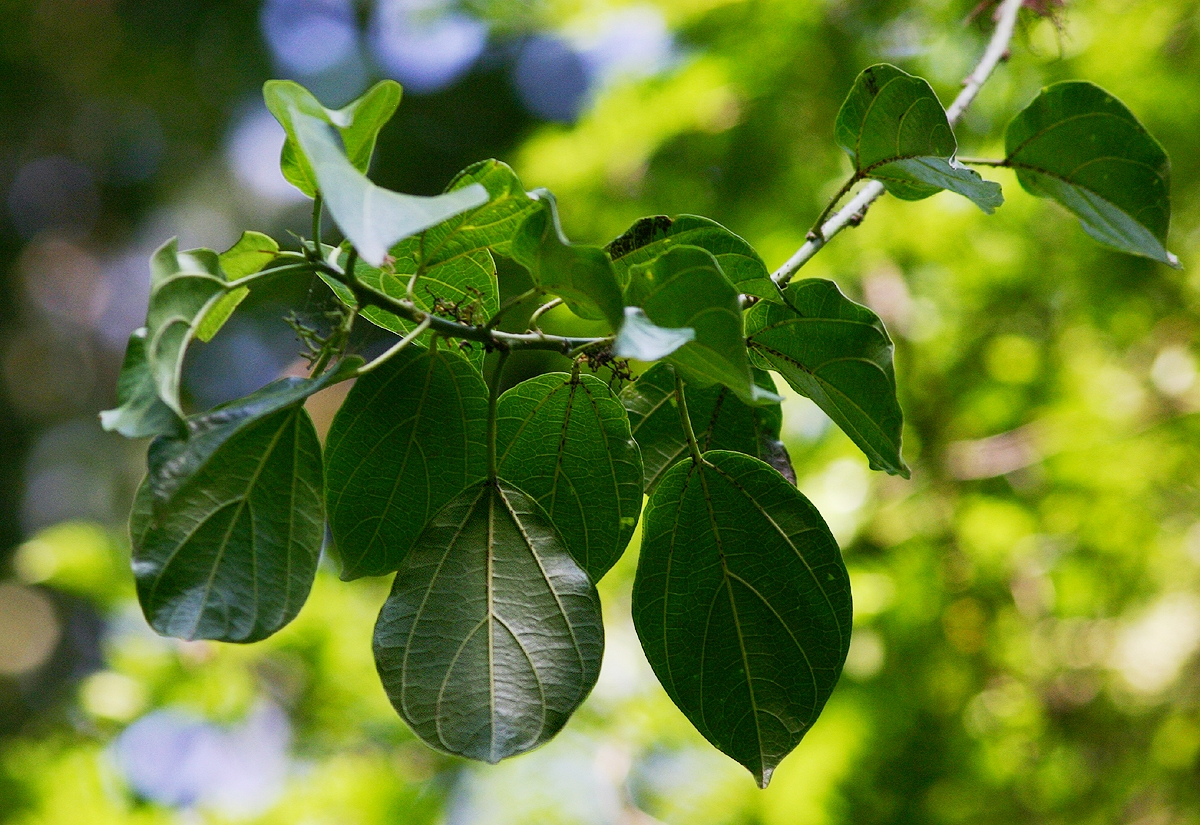

Scientific classification
- Kingdom: Plantae
- Clade: Tracheophytes
- Clade: Angiosperms
- Clade: Eudicots
- Clade: Rosids
- Order: Rosales
- Family: Urticaceae
- Genus: Urera
- Species: U. trinervis

Binomial name
- Urera trinervis (Hochst.) Friis & Immelman
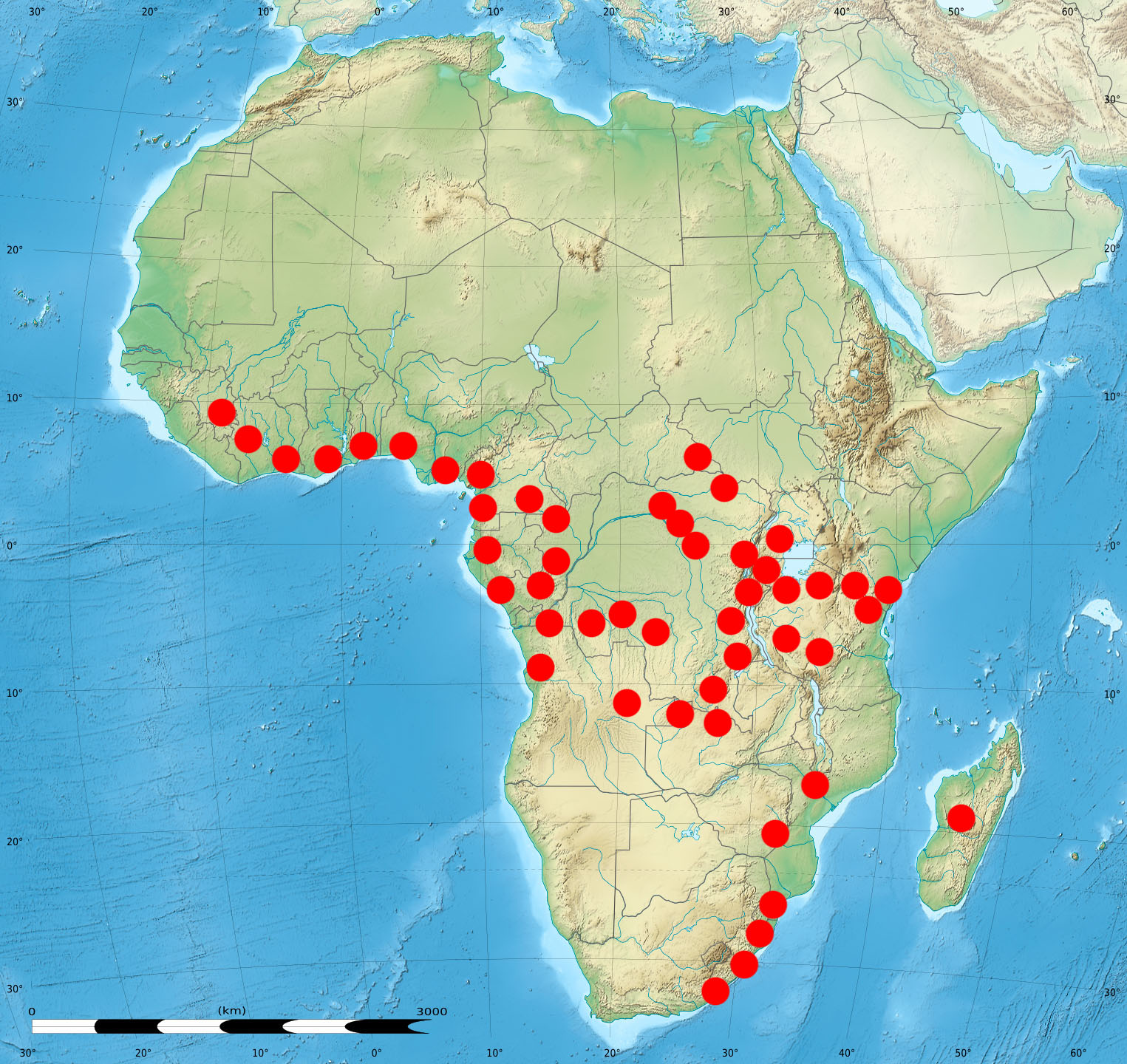

= Urera trinervis =

Tree climbing-nettle

Species of flowering plant

Scepocarpus trinervis (Hochst.) Friis & Immelman is a softly woody dioecious liane, sometimes epiphytic, climbing to 20 m, often to the canopy and hanging in festoons. It is one of some 44 species of Urera belonging to the nettle family Urticaceae. It is known in English as the tree climbing-nettle or climbing nettle.

== Habitat and range ==
Found up to 1600 m, this species is widely distributed in coastal forest, forest margins, and dune forest of the Eastern Cape (as far south as Port St Johns) and KwaZulu-Natal, in eastern Zimbabwe, north along the African east coast to Ethiopia, and across tropical Africa to Ghana. It is also known from Madagascar.

== Description ==
Attaching by adventitious roots, its stems are up to 10 cm in diameter, are occasionally armed with stinging hairs and exude copious and clear potable sap when cut. Bark is grey to brownish-black and longitudinally striate with large leaf scars on young branches. Pith is spongy, or stems are hollow in centre. Leaves are simple and with drip tips, elliptic to ovate with entire margins, and spirally arranged. Leaves are strongly 3-veined at the base, have 2–4 pairs of lateral nerves, the basal pair extending into upper third of the leaf. Flowers are small, greenish-white in colour and in lax axillary cymes. Inflorescences on male plants are paniculate, some 6.5 cm long, with dense clusters of flowers at intervals along the stalks. The female inflorescence is also lax and paniculate, about 2 cm long, with a small cymose cluster of flowers. Fruit is a small nut or achene, glabrous, 1.5–2 mm long, enclosed in persistent, fleshy, orange/red perianth lobes.

== Uses and species associations ==
The bark of this species supplies fibre for rope-making and is used for fishing lines in Nigeria and DR Congo, where it is also cooked as a vegetable. The leaves are used in the treatment of scabies in Cameroon, and chewed to allay nausea and intestinal disorders, while water flowing from cut stems is drunk to treat rapid heart beat or tachycardia. This liane is a foodplant for the larvae of several species belonging to the Nymphalidae - Acraea johnstoni, Acraea semivitrea, Acraea igola, Acraea satis, Acraea esebria, Hypolimnas salmacis, Salamis cacta.

== Synonyms ==
- Urera trinervis (Hochst.) Friis & Immelman in Nord. J. Bot. 7,2(1987)126.
- Elatostema trinerve Hochst. ex Krauss in Flora 28,5(1845)88.
- Urera cameroonensis Wedd. in A. DC., Prodr. 16,1(1869)97.
- Urera arborea De Wild & Th. Dur in Compt. Rend. Soc. Bot. Belg. 38(1900)52.
- Urera laurentii De Wild., Miss. Em. Laurent (1905)72, pl20.
- Urera gilletii De Wild. in Ann. Mus. Congo 5,1(1906)240.
- Urera woodii N.E. Br. in Kew Bull. (1911)96.
- Urera usambarensis Rendle in J. Bot. 54(1916)370.
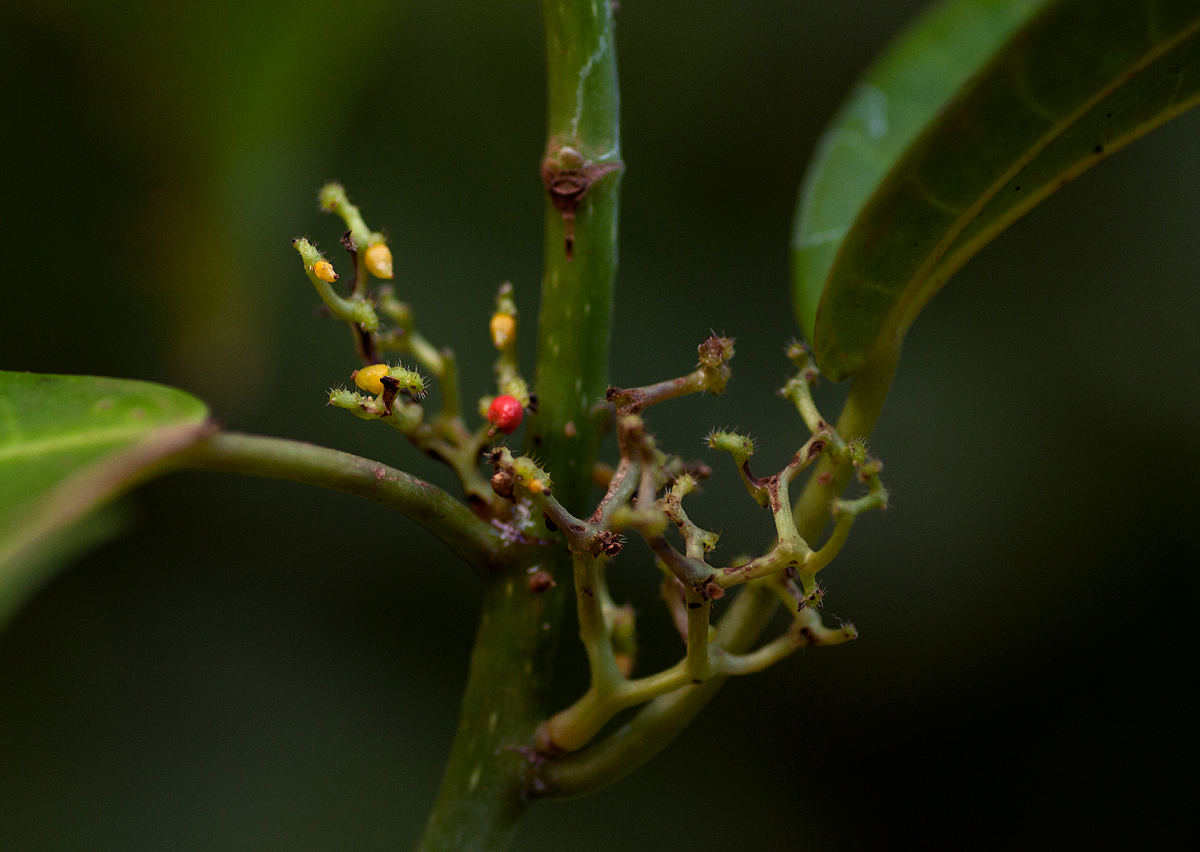
Fruit

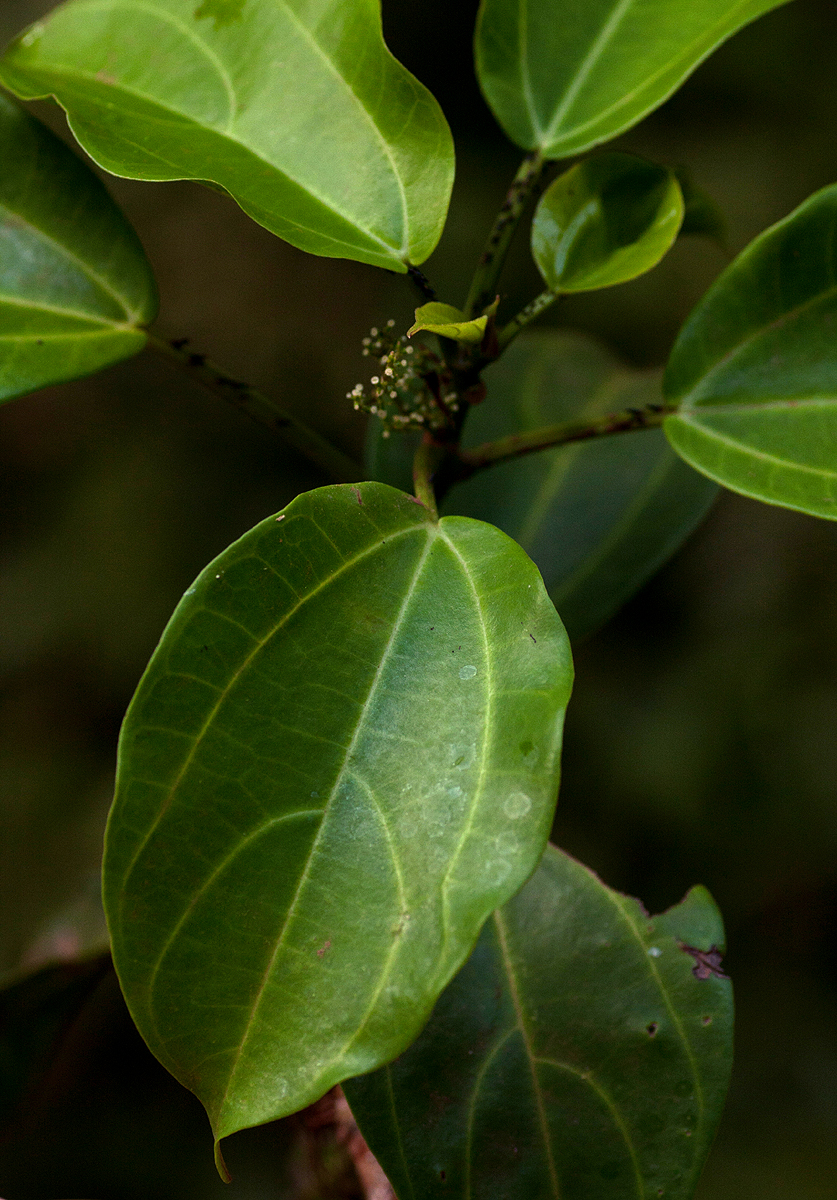
Foliage

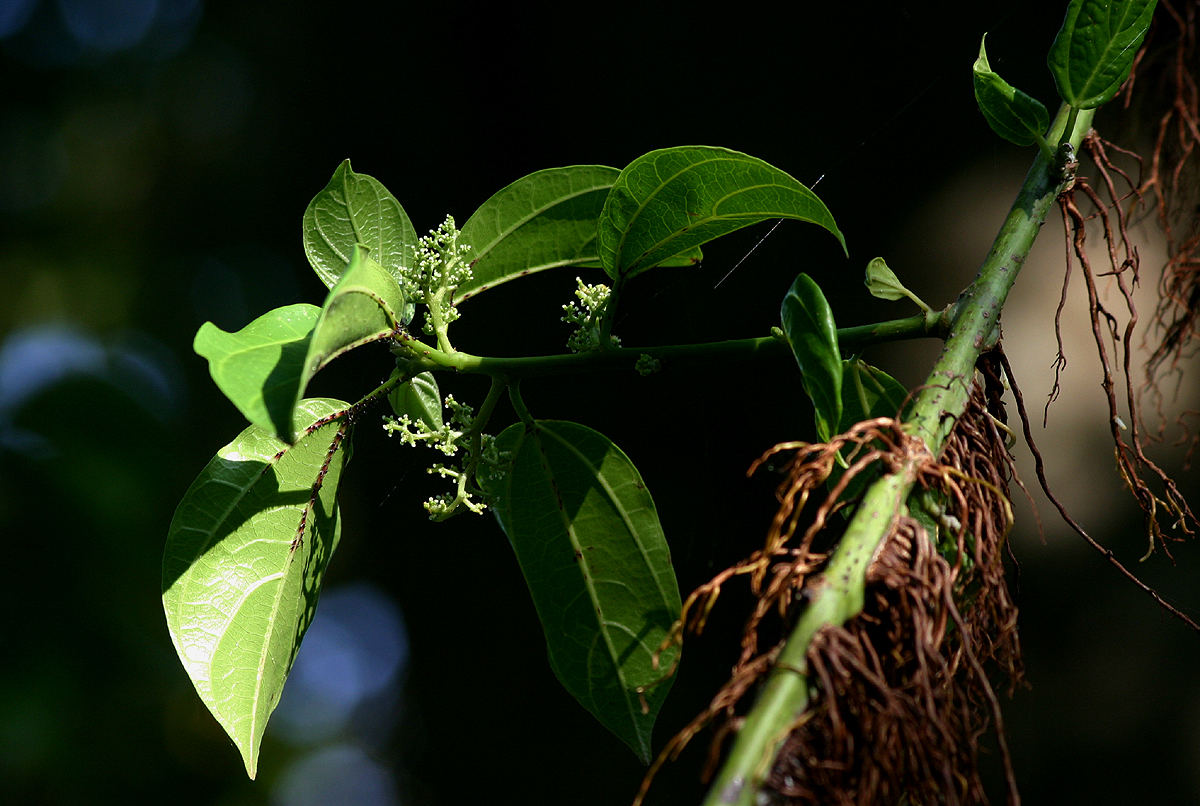
Flowers and adventitious roots

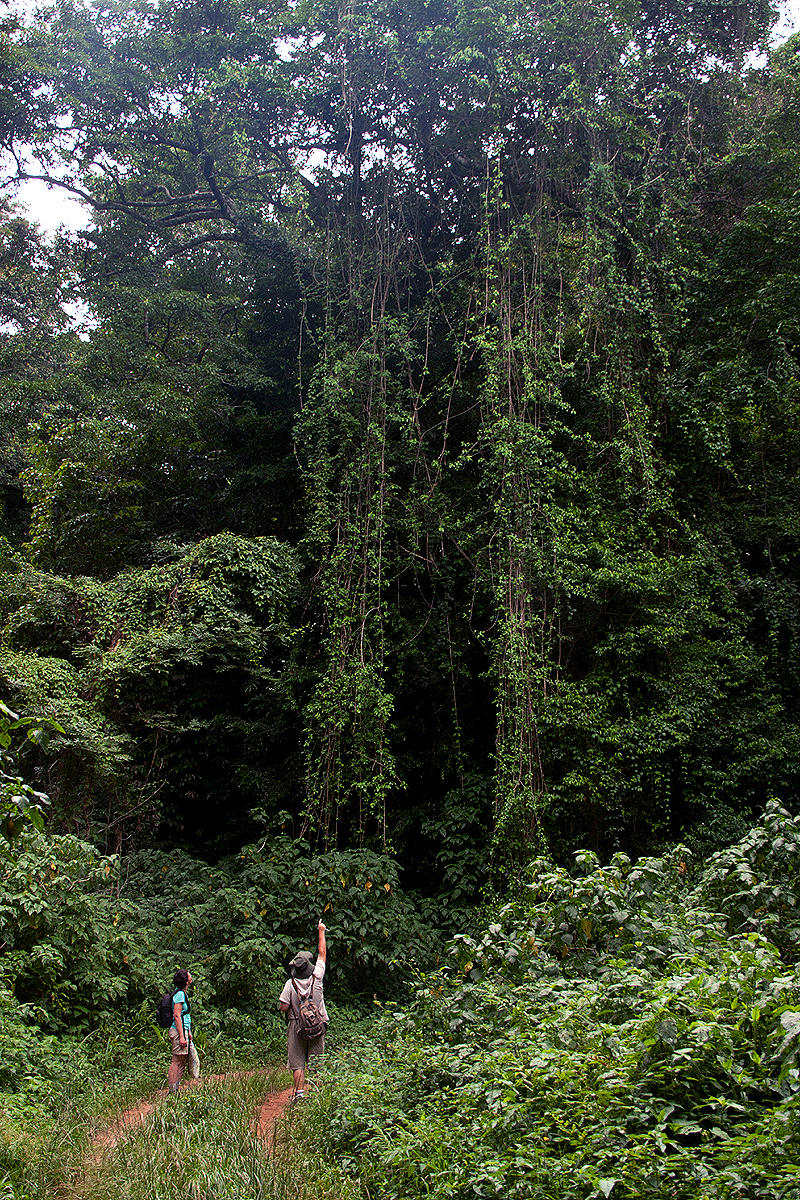
Habit
