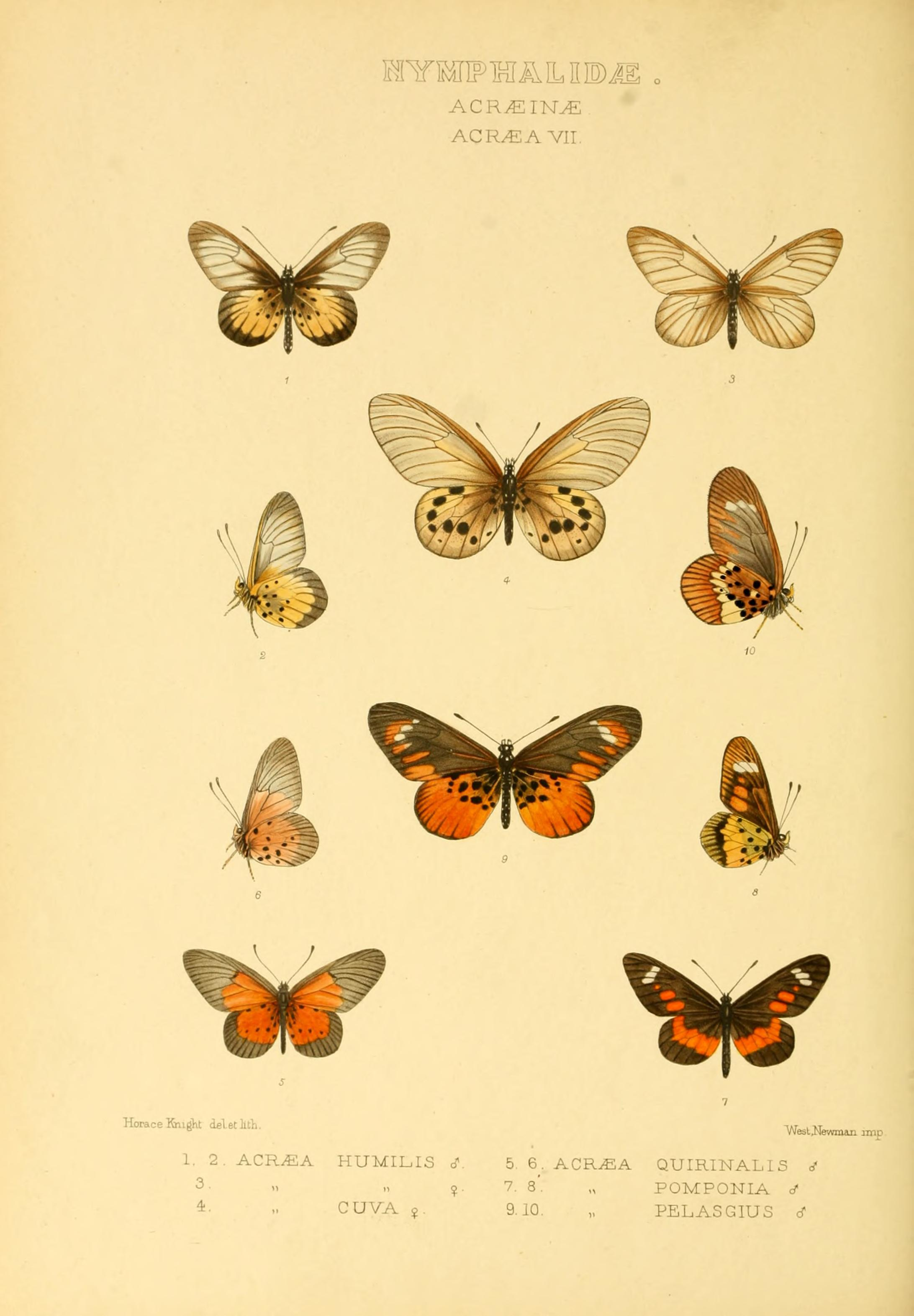

Scientific classification
- Kingdom: Animalia
- Phylum: Arthropoda
- Class: Insecta
- Order: Lepidoptera
- Family: Nymphalidae
- Genus: Acraea
- Species: A. quirinalis

Binomial name
- Acraea quirinalis Grose-Smith, 1900

Synonyms
- Acraea (Actinote) quirinalis

= Acraea quirinalis =

Species of butterfly

Acraea quirinalis is a butterfly in the family Nymphalidae. It is found in the central and eastern part of the Democratic Republic of the Congo, Uganda, western Kenya and north-western Tanzania.

== Description ==
A. quirinalis Smith is very similar to the preceding species, [ A. orestia ] but has a sharply defined red-yellow basal area on the upperside of the forewing, reaching the apex of the cell and vein 3 and enclosing a black longitudinal streak in the basal part of the cell; the red-yellow colour on the forewing quite the same as that of the hindwing; marginal band of the hindwing distinctly broader than in orestia, about 4 mm. in breadth. Eastern Congo district; Uganda; German and British East Africa.

The larvae feed on Urera hypselodendron and Laportea ovalifolia.

== Taxonomy ==
It is a member of the Acraea masamba species groupbut see also Pierre & Bernaud, 2014
