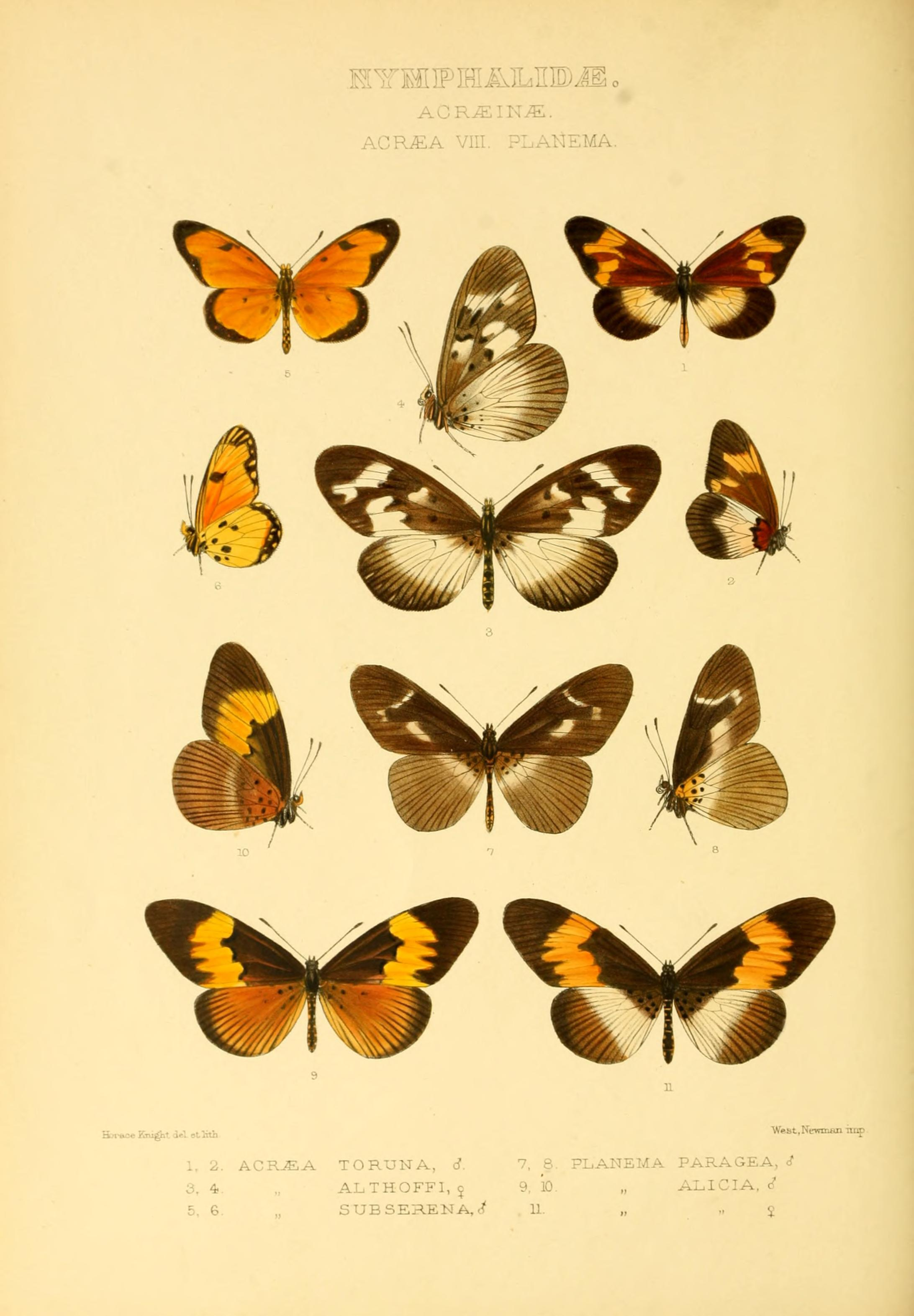
- Figures 1 and 2 male

Scientific classification
- Kingdom: Animalia
- Phylum: Arthropoda
- Class: Insecta
- Order: Lepidoptera
- Family: Nymphalidae
- Genus: Acraea
- Species: A. toruna

Binomial name
- Acraea toruna Grose-Smith, 1900

Synonyms
- Acraea (Actinote) toruna; Acraea johnstoni toruna; Acraea lycoa ab. butleri Aurivillius, 1899; Acraea johnstoni butleri Eltringham, 1912

= Acraea toruna =

Species of butterfly

Acraea toruna is a butterfly in the family Nymphalidae. It is found in south-western Uganda, Rwanda and the Democratic Republic of the Congo (Ituri and Kivu).

== Description ==
Very close to Acraea johnstoni q.v. for differences.

== Taxonomy ==
See Pierre & Bernaud, 2014
