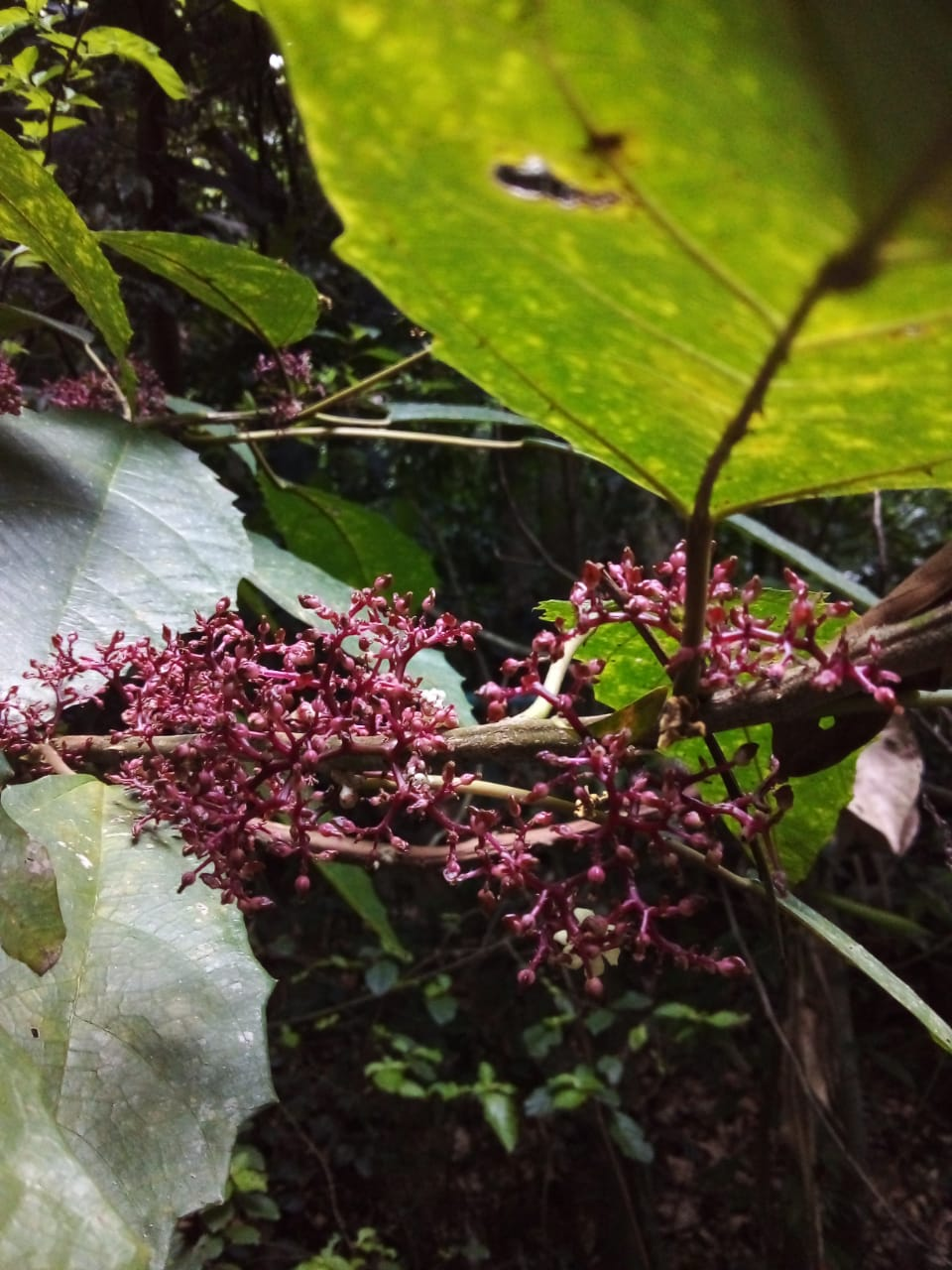

Scientific classification
- Kingdom: Plantae
- Clade: Tracheophytes
- Clade: Angiosperms
- Clade: Eudicots
- Clade: Rosids
- Order: Rosales
- Family: Urticaceae
- Genus: Urera
- Species: U. nitida

Binomial name
- Urera nitida (Vell.) P.Brack

Synonyms
- Urtica nitida Vell.; Urera baccifera var. angustifolia Wedd.; Urera denticulata Miq.

= Urera nitida =

Species of plant

Urera nitida is a species of flowering plant from the family Urticaceae. It is native to Brazil.
