= Gyrotaenia microcarpa =

Conservation status
- Near Threatened (IUCN 2.3)

Scientific classification
- Kingdom: Plantae
- Clade: Tracheophytes
- Clade: Angiosperms
- Clade: Eudicots
- Clade: Rosids
- Order: Rosales
- Family: Urticaceae
- Genus: Gyrotaenia
- Species: G. microcarpa

Binomial name
- Gyrotaenia microcarpa (Wedd.) F. & R.

Species of flowering plant

Gyrotaenia microcarpa is a species of plant in the family Urticaceae. It is endemic to Jamaica.
