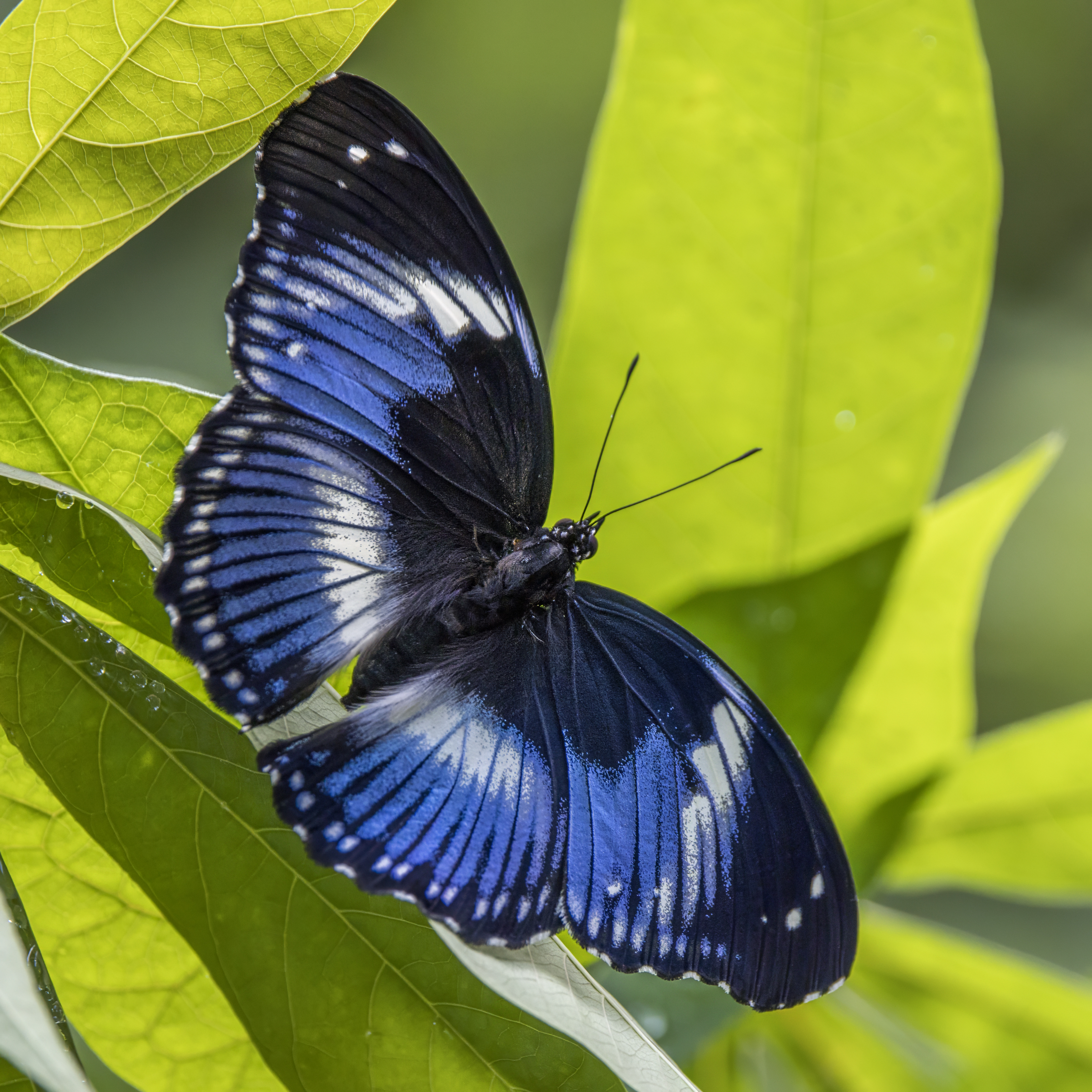

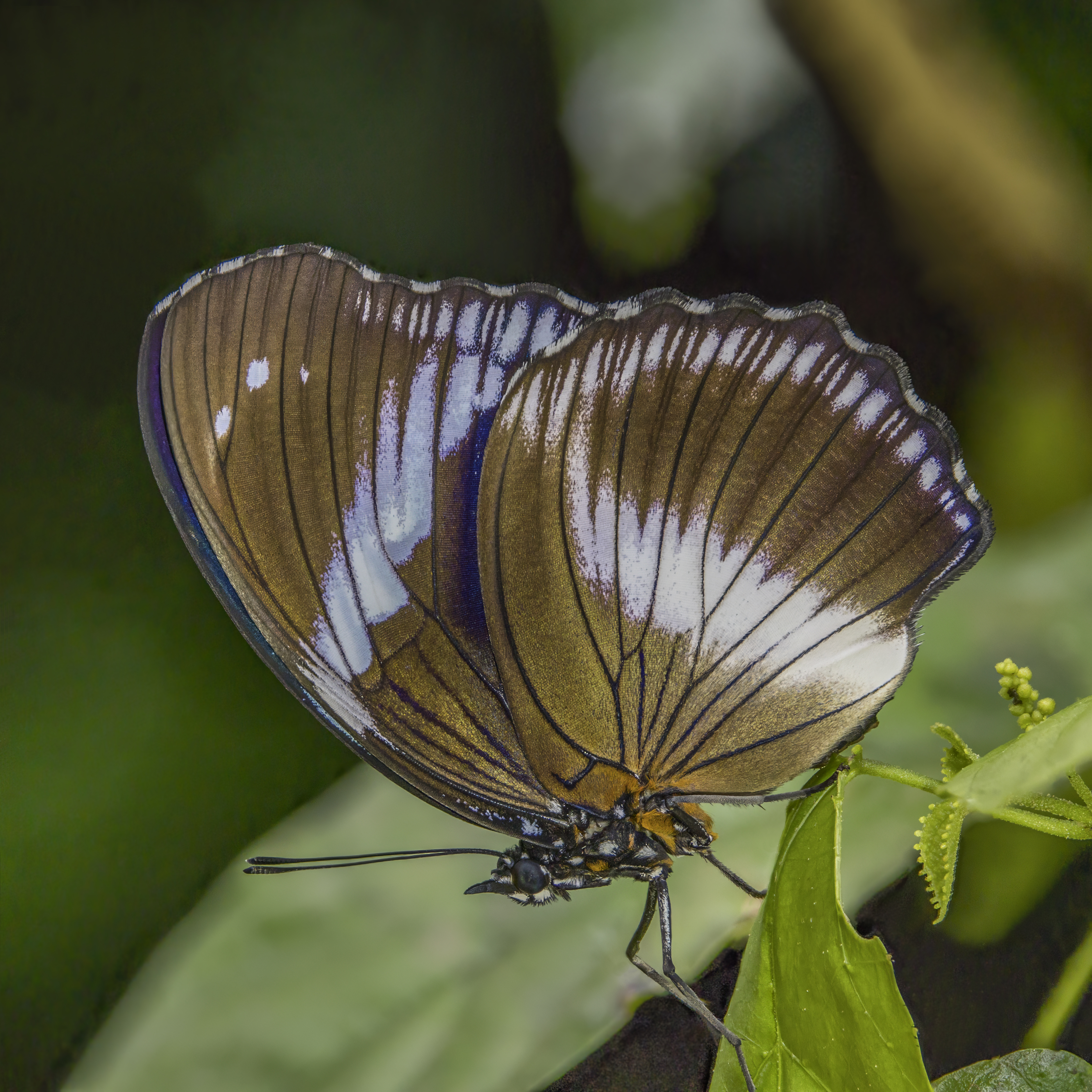
- Both male H. s. salmacis, Ghana

Scientific classification
- Kingdom: Animalia
- Phylum: Arthropoda
- Clade: Pancrustacea
- Class: Insecta
- Order: Lepidoptera
- Family: Nymphalidae
- Genus: Hypolimnas
- Species: H. salmacis

Binomial name
- Hypolimnas salmacis (Drury, 1773)

Synonyms
- Papilio salmacis Drury, 1773; Papilio omphale Stoll, 1790; Hypolimnas salmacis cissalma Suffert, 1904; Hypolimnas salmacis f. ochreata Joicey and Talbot, 1921; Hypolimnas salmacis salmacis ab. transiens Dufrane, 1953; Hypolimnas salmacis salmacis ab. interrupta Dufrane, 1953; Hypolimnas salmacis var. insularis Schultze, 1920; Hypolimnas salmacis ulysses Collins, 1987; Hypolimnas salmacis ulysses f. patra Collins, 1987; Hypolimnas salmacis ulysses f. helenae Canu, 1994; Hypolimnas salmacis ulysses f. penelope Canu, 1994; Hypolimnas salmacis var. thomensis Aurivillius, 1910

= Hypolimnas salmacis =

Species of butterfly

Hypolimnas salmacis, the blue diadem, is a butterfly in the family Nymphalidae. It is found in Sierra Leone, Liberia, Ivory Coast, Ghana, Togo, Benin, Nigeria, Cameroon, Gabon, the Republic of the Congo, Angola, Equatorial Guinea, São Tomé and Príncipe, the DRC, Uganda, Sudan, Ethiopia, Kenya and Tanzania.

The larvae feed on Urera hypselodendron, U. trinervis and Fleurya species.

== Subspecies ==
- Hypolimnas salmacis salmacis (Sierra Leone, Liberia, Ivory Coast, Ghana, Togo, Benin, Nigeria, Cameroon, Gabon, Congo, Angola: Cabinda, Democratic Republic of the Congo, Uganda: west to the Bwamba Valley)
- Hypolimnas salmacis insularis Schultze, 1920 (Bioko)
- Hypolimnas salmacis magnifica Rothschild, 1918 (Uganda, western Kenya, north-western Tanzania)
- Hypolimnas salmacis platydema Rothschild & Jordan, 1903 (southern Ethiopia, southern Sudan)
- Hypolimnas salmacis thomensis Aurivillius, 1910 (São Tomé)

Torben Larsen developed a species numbering system for his 2005 publication Butterflies of West Africa. The nominate subspecies is #806. The 'Larsen' numbers have since been used with permission in A Sharp Eye on Butterflies of Ghana.

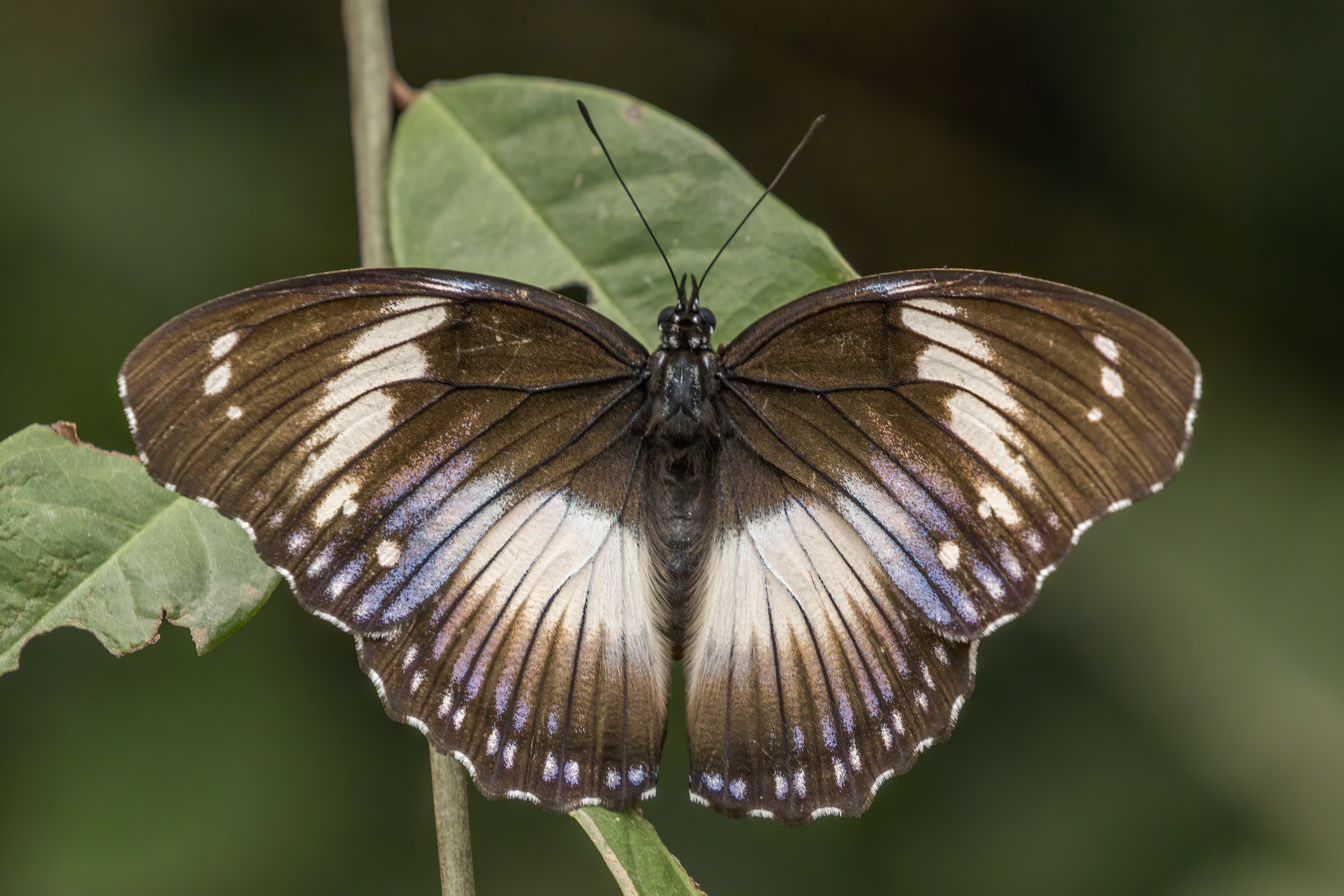
female H. s. salmacis, Ghana

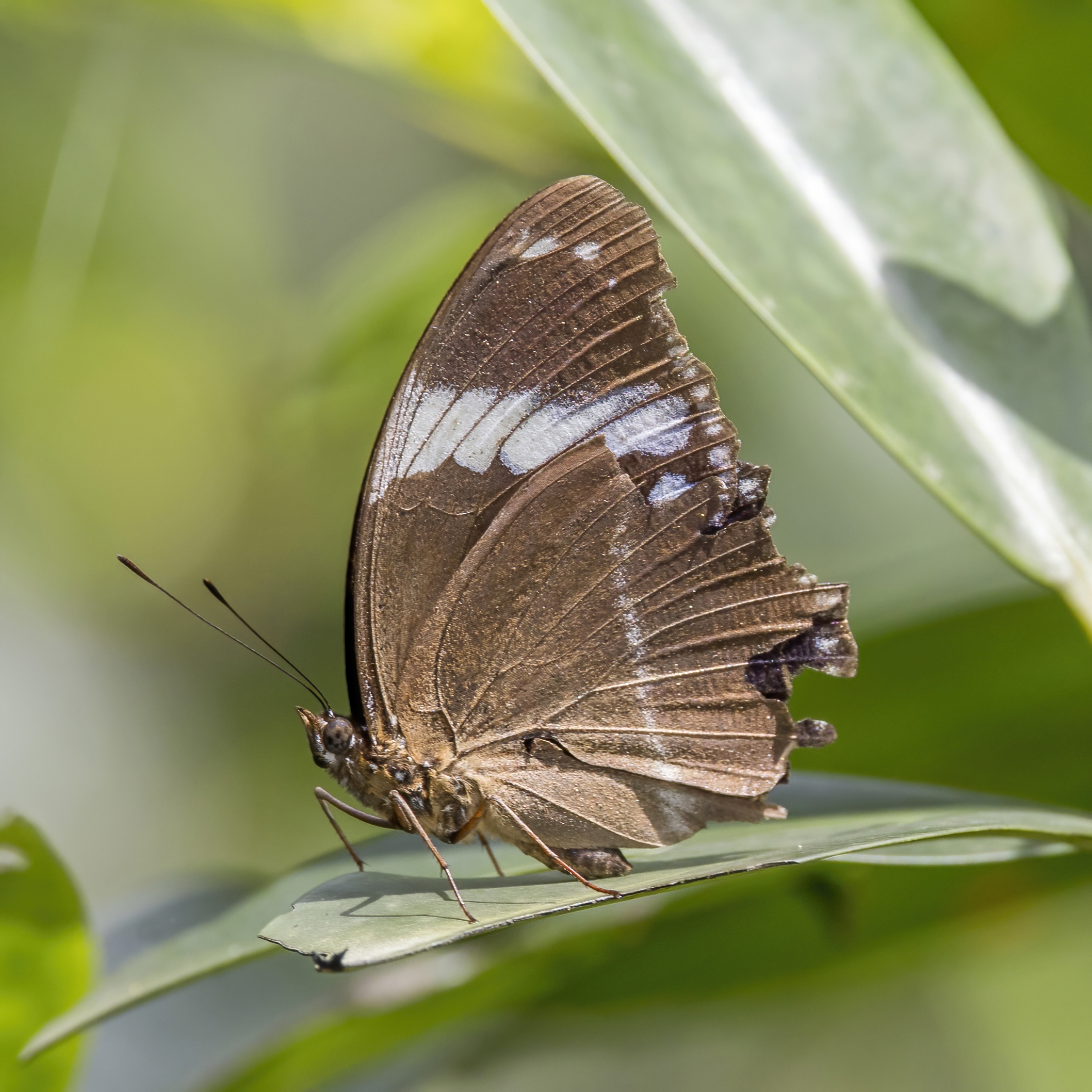
H. s. thomensis, São Tomé and Príncipe
