= Gyrotaenia spicata =

Conservation status
- Near Threatened (IUCN 2.3)

Scientific classification
- Kingdom: Plantae
- Clade: Tracheophytes
- Clade: Angiosperms
- Clade: Eudicots
- Clade: Rosids
- Order: Rosales
- Family: Urticaceae
- Genus: Gyrotaenia
- Species: G. spicata

Binomial name
- Gyrotaenia spicata (Wedd.) Wedd.

Species of flowering plant

Gyrotaenia spicata is a species of plant in the family Urticaceae. It is endemic to Jamaica. it is also known as urera spicata
