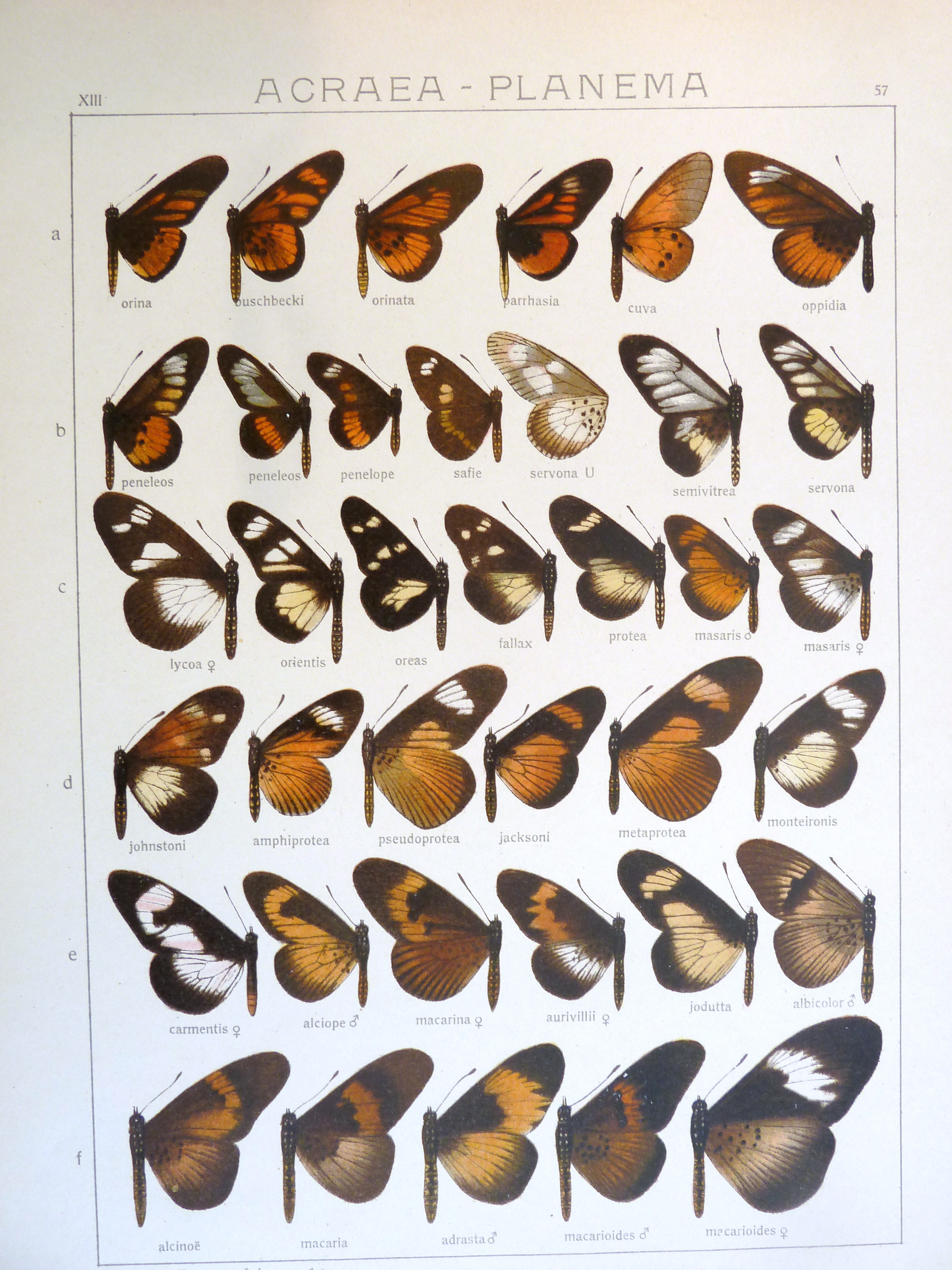
- In Adalbert Seitz's Fauna Africana

Scientific classification
- Kingdom: Animalia
- Phylum: Arthropoda
- Class: Insecta
- Order: Lepidoptera
- Family: Nymphalidae
- Genus: Acraea
- Species: A. semivitrea

Binomial name
- Acraea semivitrea Aurivillius, 1895

Synonyms
- Acraea (Actinote) semivitrea; Acraea pervia Sharpe, 1897

= Acraea semivitrea =

Glassy acraea

Species of butterfly

Acraea semivitrea, the glassy acraea, is a butterfly in the family Nymphalidae. It is found in Cameroon, the Democratic Republic of the Congo, Uganda, western Kenya and north-western Tanzania.

== Description ==
A. semivitrea Auriv. (27 b). Forewing diaphanous with fine black veins and black margins; the broad marginal band forms on its proximal side triangular black spots on veins 2-5. Hindwing above at the base black-brown with black dots and at the distal margin with a broad black band, between these with light median band, widened at the inner margin, sulphur-yellow in cellules la, lb, 1 c and 2 and often also in the cell, but in the other cellules diaphanous. On the under surface all the black parts of the upperside are bright light yellow; the black streaks on the interneural folds are proximally thickened, distally pointed, and often do not quite reach the distal margin; cell with 2 or 3, cellule 7 with 1 or 2 black dots; cellules 2-6 without discal dots. Congo to Uganda

== Biology ==
Their habitat consists of sub-montane and lowland forests.

Adult males mud-puddle and are attracted to dung.

The larvae feed on Urera trinervis.

== Taxonomy ==
It is a member of the Acraea circeis species group - but see also Pierre & Bernaud, 2014
