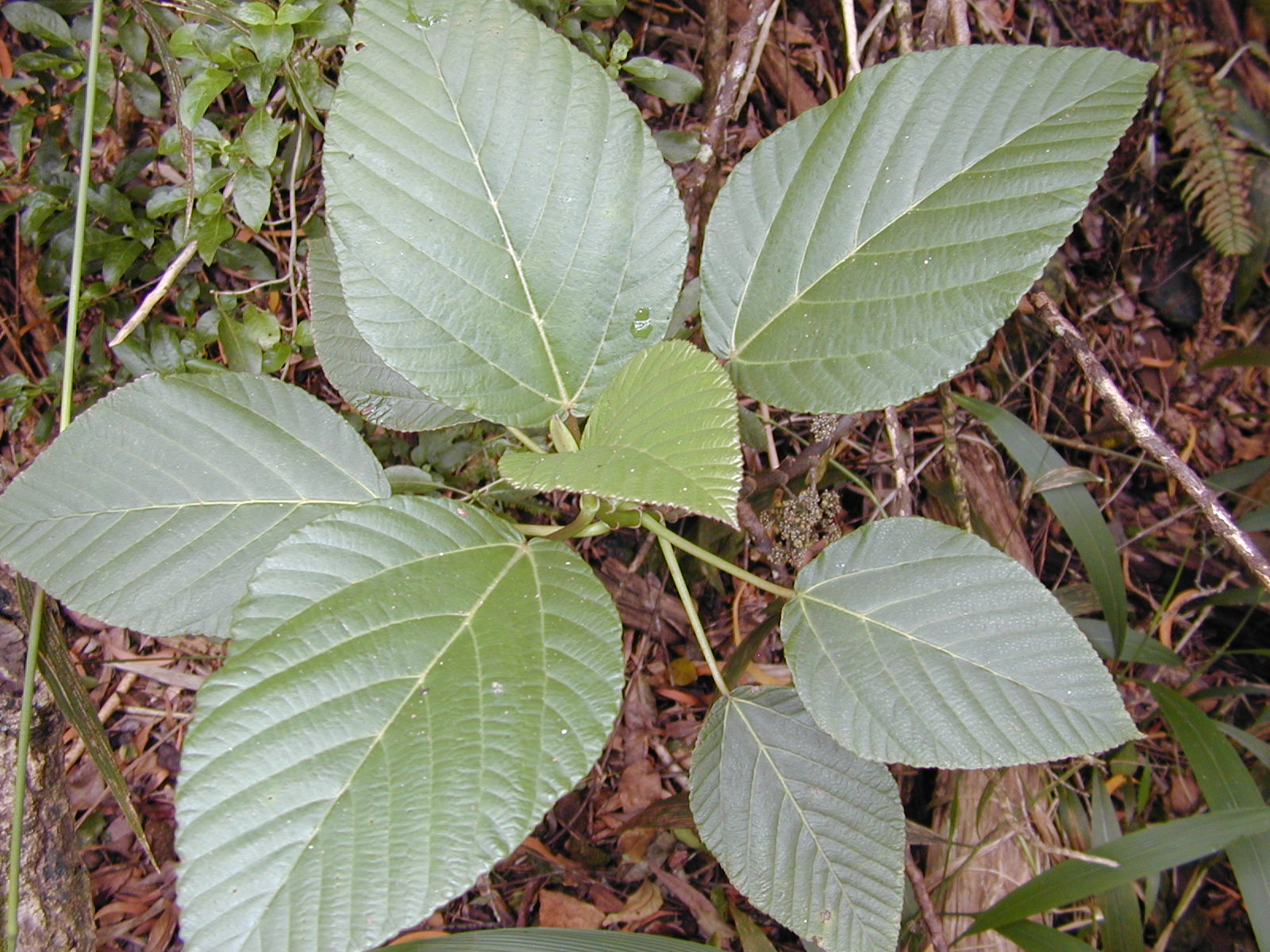
- Touchardia sandwicensis at Makawao Forest Reserve, Maui

Scientific classification
- Kingdom: Plantae
- Clade: Tracheophytes
- Clade: Angiosperms
- Clade: Eudicots
- Clade: Rosids
- Order: Rosales
- Family: Urticaceae
- Genus: Touchardia
- Species: T. sandwicensis

Binomial name
- Touchardia sandwicensis (Wedd.) ined.

Synonyms
- Procris glabra Hook. & Arn. (1832); Touchardia oahuensis T.Wells & A.K.Monro (2020); Urera glabra (Hook. & Arn.) Wedd. (1856); Urera glabra var. mollis Wedd. (1856); Urera konaensis H.St.John (1976); Urera sandwicensis Wedd. (1854) (basionym)

= Touchardia sandwicensis =

Species of flowering plant

Touchardia sandwicensis is a species of flowering plant in the family Urticaceae. It is a tree native to the Hawaiian Islands, where it is commonly known as ōpuhe, hōpue, or hona.

It is a medium-sized evergreen tree growing to 35 ft (10.7 m) tall on the island of Hawaii, and a shrub or small tree on the other islands. It has a straight trunk up to 1 foot in diameter, and grey, smooth, fibrous bark. Leaves are large, alternate, and oblong or narrowly elliptical, 15–36 centimetres (5.9–14.2 in) long by 4–12 centimetres (1.6–4.7 in) wide, on a leaf stalk 3–5 centimetres (1.2–2.0 in) long. They are pointed at the apex and blunt at the base, with wavy teeth along the margins. Plants are dioecious, and flowers grow in clusters (cymes) of numerous tiny flowers along twigs and at the base of leaves. Fruits are rounded and about 3 millimetres (0.12 in) in diameter, containing a single seed.

It is widespread in moist forests throughout the islands, growing from 150–1,680 metres (490–5,510 ft) elevation on Hawaii.

The species was first described as Urera sandwicensis by Hugh Algernon Weddell in 1854. It is known by several synonyms, including Urera glabra. A phylogenetic analysis published in 2021 revealed that U. sandwicensis is more closely related to Touchardia latifolia, another Hawaiian endemic, than to the other species in genus Urera, and the species was placed in genus Touchardia as T. sandwicensis.
