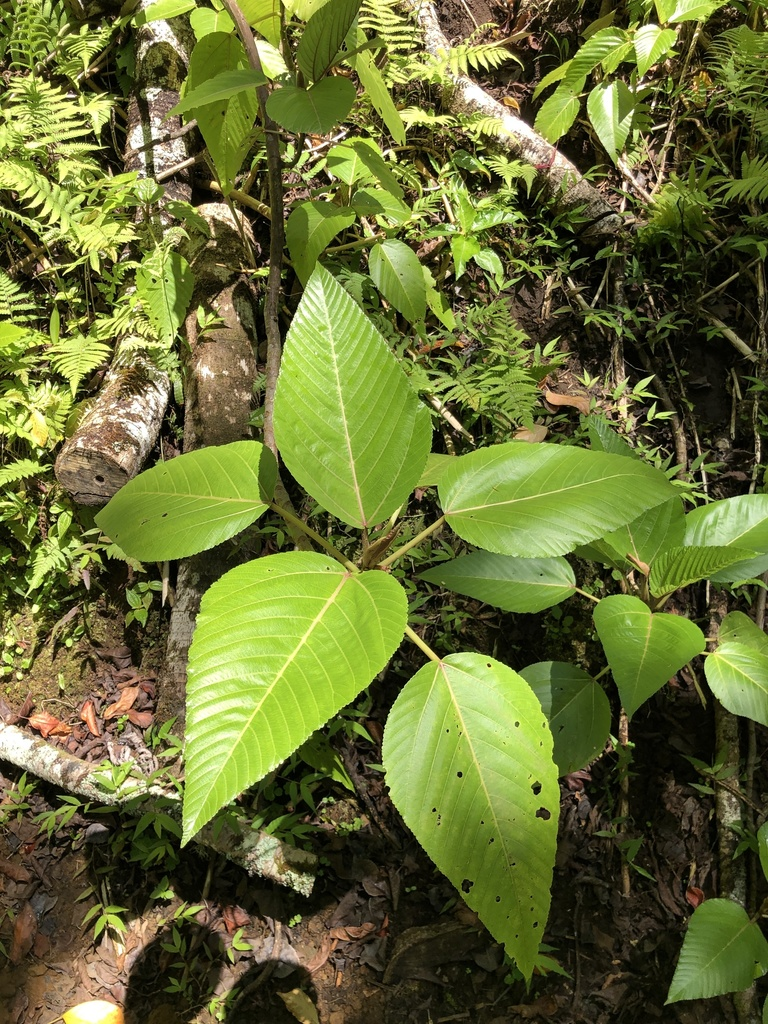
- Touchardia latifolia is one of two known species within the genus.

Scientific classification
- Kingdom: Plantae
- Clade: Tracheophytes
- Clade: Angiosperms
- Clade: Eudicots
- Clade: Rosids
- Order: Rosales
- Family: Urticaceae
- Tribe: Urticeae
- Genus: Touchardia; Gaudich. (1848)

Species
- Touchardia latifolia Gaudich.; Touchardia sandwicensis (Wedd.) ined.

= Touchardia =

Genus of flowering plants

Touchardia is a genus of flowering plants in the nettle family, Urticaceae. It includes two species native to the Hawaiian Islands.

- Touchardia latifolia Gaudich.
- Touchardia sandwicensis (Wedd.) ined.

The name Touchardia is in honour of Philippe Victor Touchard (1810–1879), a French vice-admiral.
