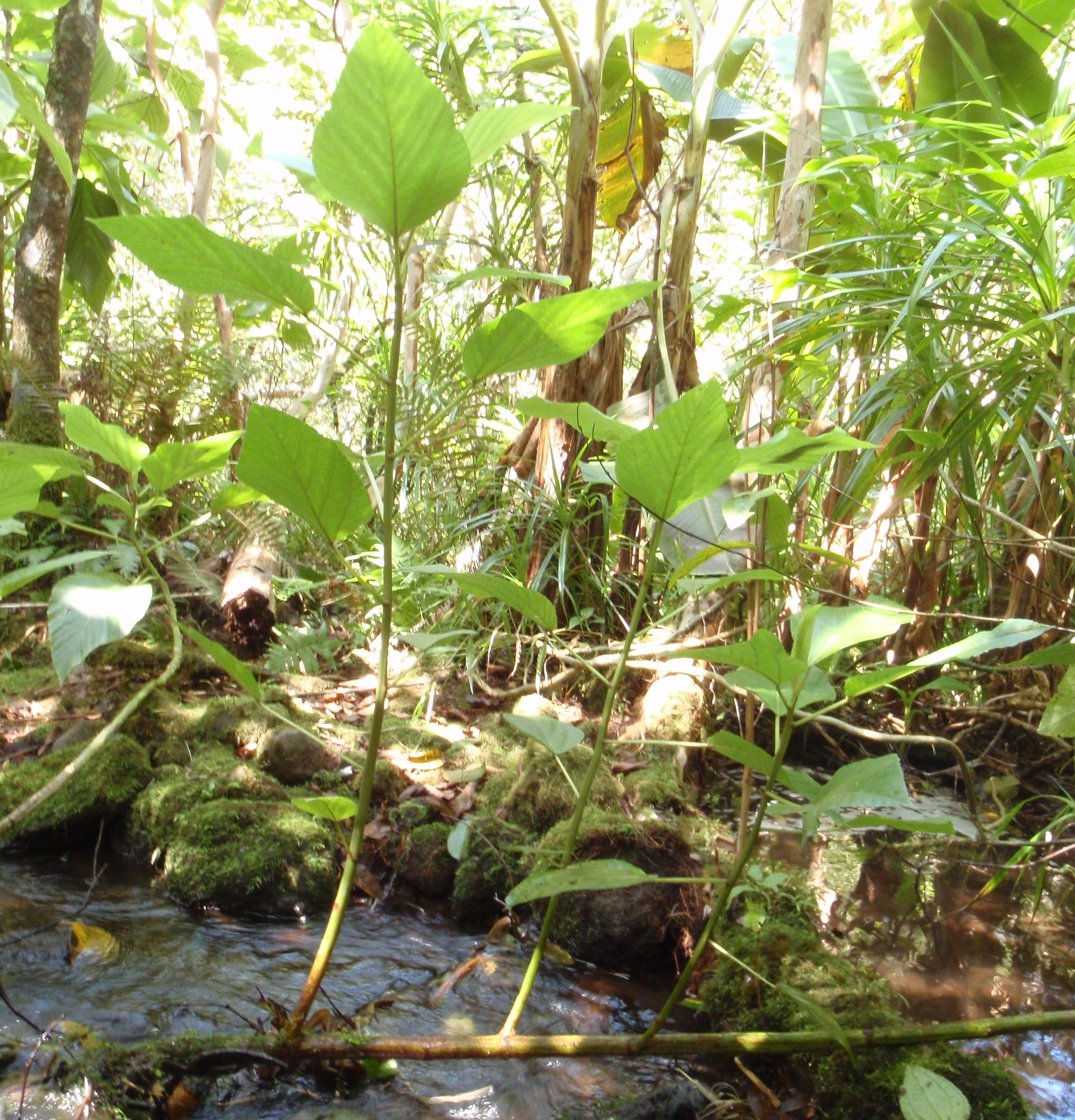

Conservation status
- Vulnerable (NatureServe)

Scientific classification
- Kingdom: Plantae
- Clade: Embryophytes
- Clade: Tracheophytes
- Clade: Angiosperms
- Clade: Eudicots
- Clade: Rosids
- Order: Rosales
- Family: Urticaceae
- Tribe: Urticeae
- Genus: Touchardia
- Species: T. latifolia

Binomial name
- Touchardia latifolia Gaudich. (1848)

Synonyms
- Synonymy: Touchardia angusta H.St.John (1985); Touchardia christensenii H.St.John (1987); Touchardia glabra H.St.John (1987); Touchardia haupuensis H.St.John (1987); Touchardia iaoensis H.St.John (1987); Touchardia konaensis H.St.John (1987); Touchardia lanaiensis H.St.John (1987); Touchardia molokaiensis H.St.John (1987); Touchardia nana H.St.John (1987); Touchardia napaliensis H.St.John (1987); Touchardia occidentalis H.St.John (1987); Touchardia wailauensis H.St.John (1987); Touchardia wainihaensis H.St.John (1987)

= Touchardia latifolia =

Olonā

Species of flowering plant

Touchardia latifolia is a species of flowering plant in the nettle family, Urticaceae. It is commonly known as olonā in Hawaiian. It is endemic to the Hawaiian Islands.

== Etymology ==
The genus name of Touchardia is in honour of Philippe Victor Touchard (1810–1879), a French vice-admiral. The Latin specific epithet of latifolia means long flat leaves. Both the genus and the species were first described and published in Voy. Bonite, Bot. Vol.3 on table 94 in 1848.

== Description ==
Typical to many Hawaiian plants, olonā does not have the stinging hairs found in its mainland cousins. It is found on all the main Hawaiian islands except Kahoʻolawe and Niʻihau. Olonā has alternate leaves whose shape greatly varies depending upon the environment from thin lanceolate to broad elliptic. The large range in leaf variation once divided T. latifolia into more than 10 species, which are currently considered to be one. Olonā typically flowers between the months of May through December The female flowers are borne on branching cymes which become fleshy orange berry-like achenes, and the male flowers are white. Olonā is easily cultivated (83% germination rate), and sprouts readily from cuttings, but does not transplant well due to its fragile roots.

== Distribution and habitat ==
Touchardia latifolia is endemic to Hawaii and is found in mesic valleys and wet forests at elevations of 70–1,200 m (230–3,940 ft).

== Cultural use ==
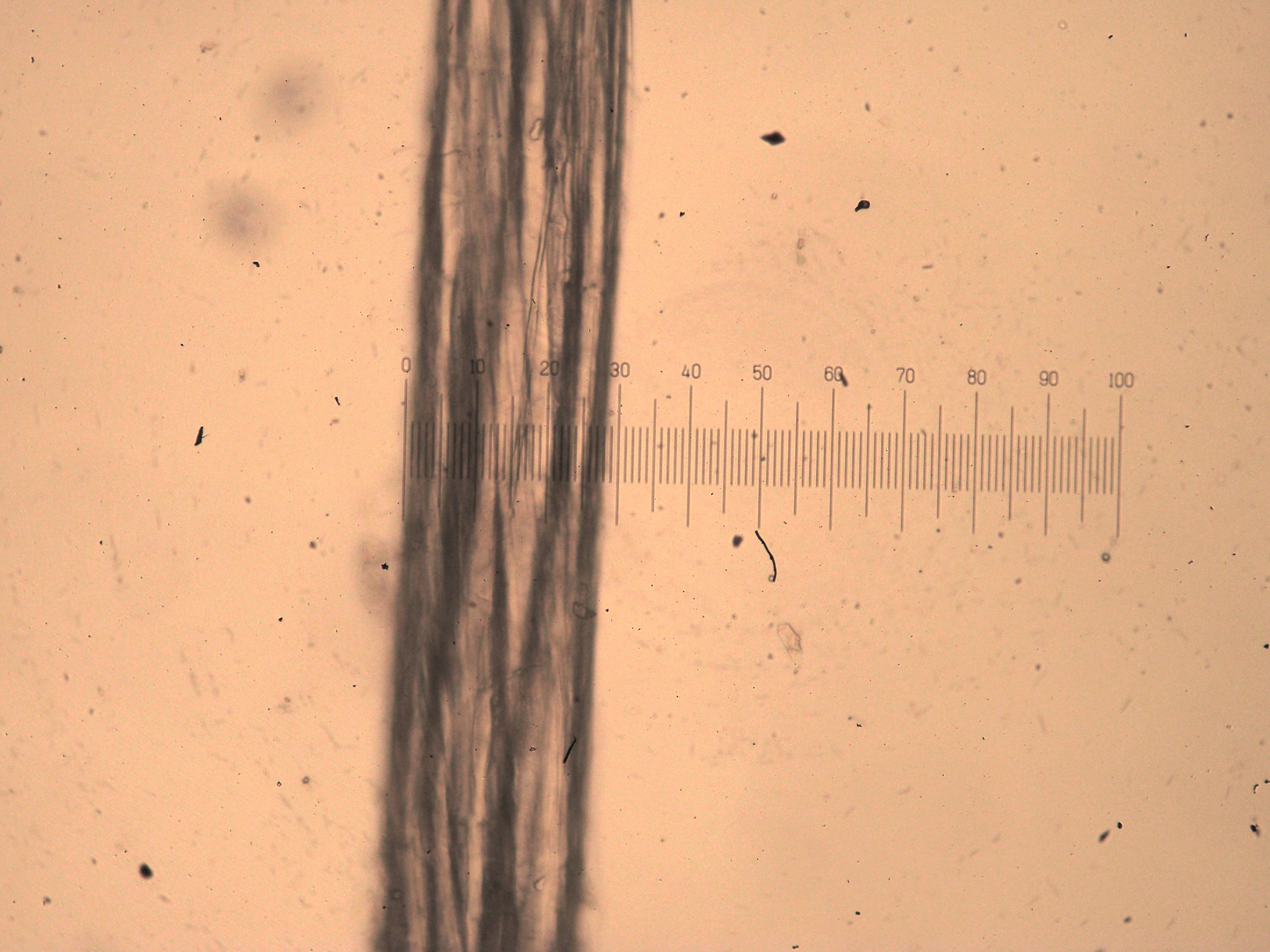
Single olonā fiber (0.3 mm wide)

Native Hawaiians cultivated olonā for cordage, and it was considered one of the finest grades of fibers. Its intertwining strands makes it one of the strongest natural fibers on earth. Olonā was used extensively in Hawaiian weaponry: as cordage on the wrist loop of pāhoa (daggers); for fastening shark teeth on the heads of leiomano; and as the cord in "tripping weapons", such as the pīkoi. Olonā was also used for fishing nets and carrying baskets called kōkō. The fine cordage was once sought by many people around the world, like climbers and sailors, because of its incomparable strength and durability. Olonā was typically cultivated near an upland stream area which was used to soak the newly harvested fibers between 24 and 72 hours before placing it on long board and using a scraper (sometimes made out of shell or turtle) to remove the excess outer bark. Once the olonā was prepared and dry, there was so much fiber in the bark that it peels off in sheets of ribbon. The outer bark of olonā was typically stripped in the uplands and hung around necks as lei.

== See also ==
- Ramie
