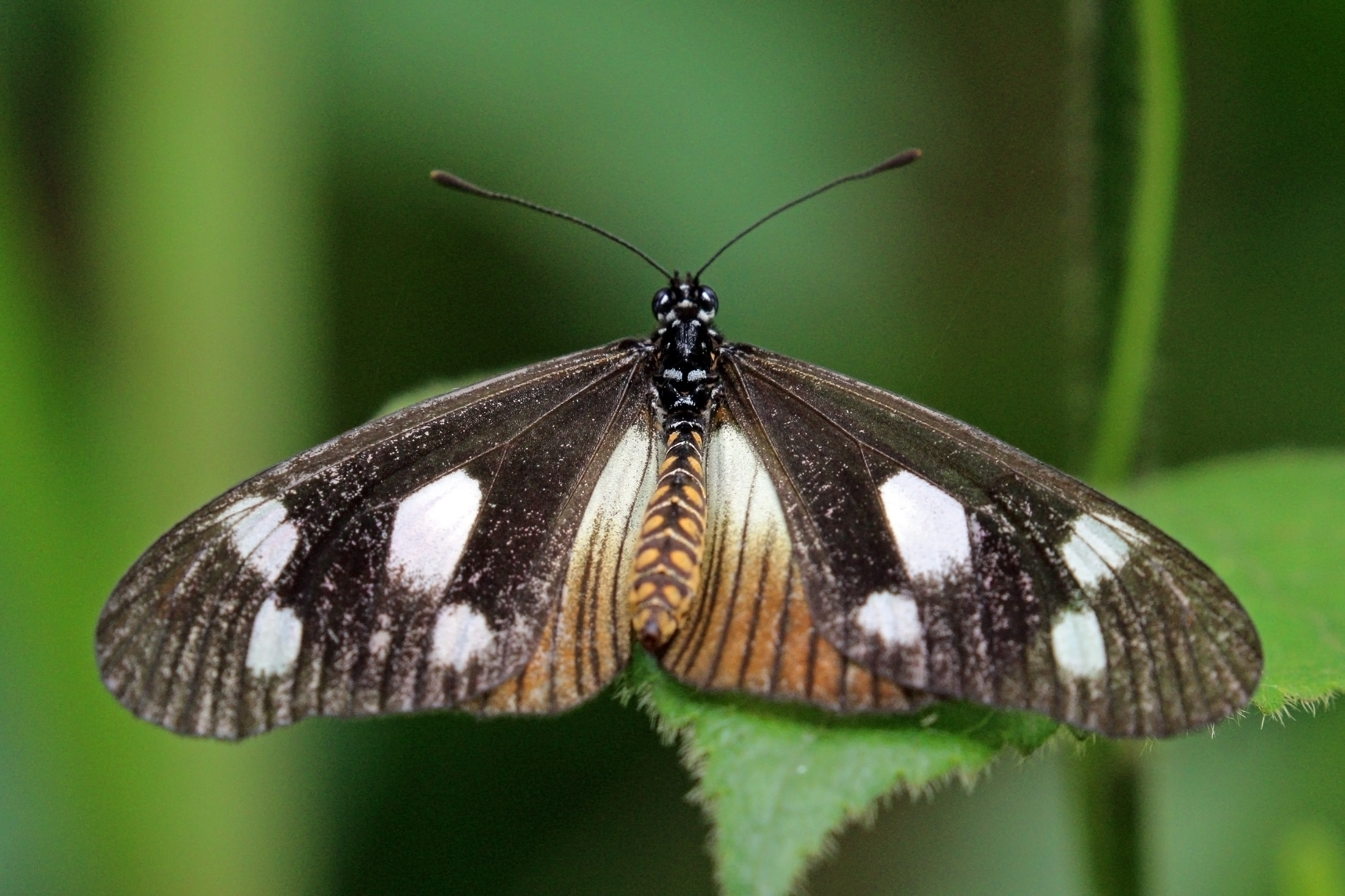

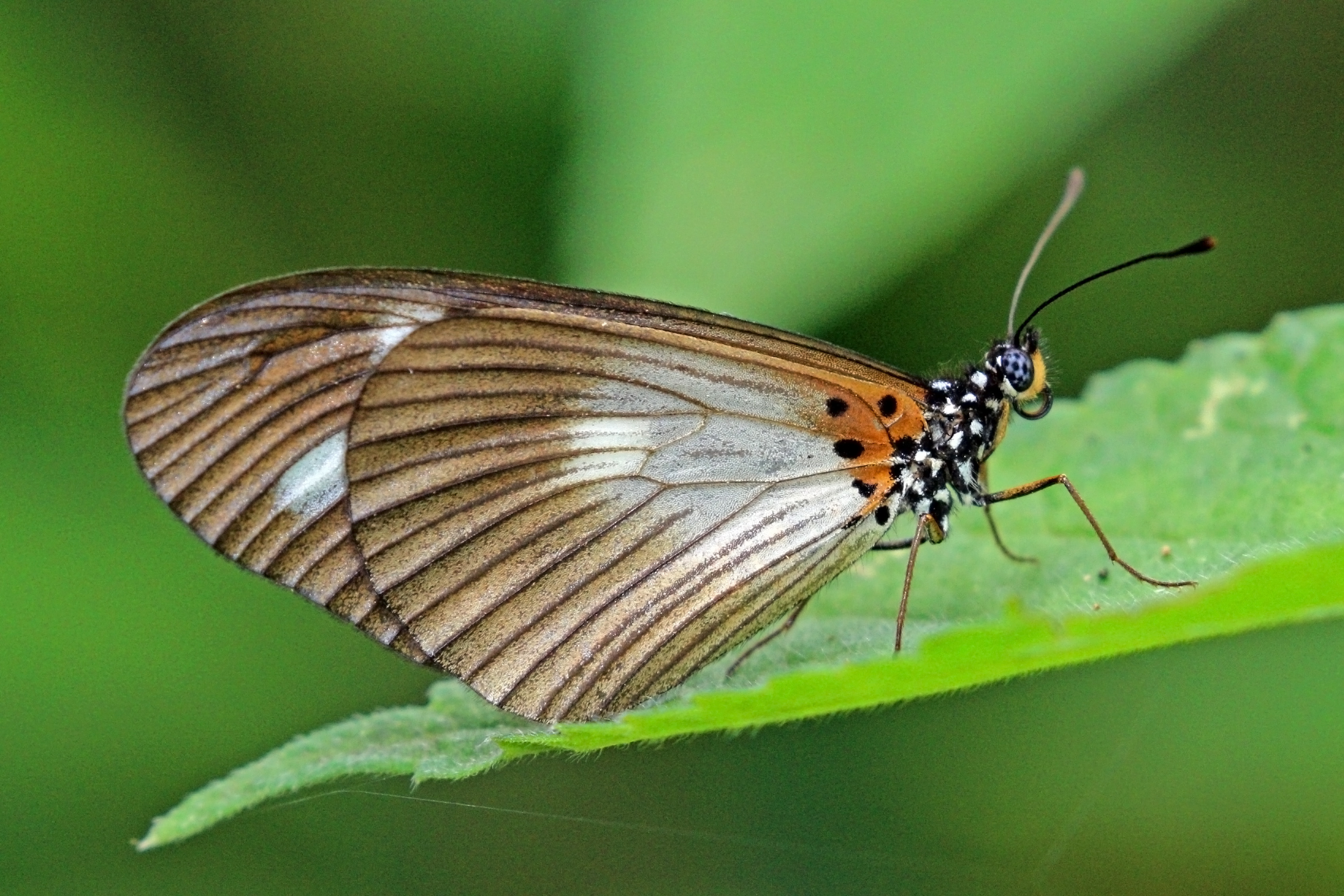
- both female A. l. entebbia Kibale Forest, Uganda

Scientific classification
- Kingdom: Animalia
- Phylum: Arthropoda
- Clade: Pancrustacea
- Class: Insecta
- Order: Lepidoptera
- Family: Nymphalidae
- Genus: Acraea
- Species: A. lycoa

Binomial name
- Acraea lycoa Godart, 1819 Paris.

Synonyms
- Acraea (Actinote) lycoa; Planema fallax Rogenhofer, 1891; Acraea kilimandjara Oberthür, 1893; Acraea lycoa aequalis Rothschild & Jordan, 1905; Acraea lycoa bukoba Eltringham, 1911; Acraea lycoa entebbia Eltringham, 1911; Acraea lycoa kenia Eltringham, 1911; Acraea lycoa media Eltringham, 1911; Acraea lycoa tirika Eltringham, 1911; Acraea lycoa f. eltringhami Schouteden, 1919; Acraea johnstoni f. praelongata Joicey & Talbot, 1927; Acraea lycoa mediafra Stoneham, 1936; Acraea lycoa bukoba ab. bipunctata Dufrane, 1945; Acraea lycoa stonehami d'Abrera, 1980; Acraea johnstoni praelongata Hancock & Heath, 1988; Acraea johnstoni praelongata f. albimaculosa Hancock & Heath, 1988; Acraea lycoa f. kindua Ackery, 1995

= Acraea lycoa =

Lycoa acraea

Species of butterfly

Acraea lycoa, the lycoa acraea, is a butterfly in the family Nymphalidae which is native to the African tropics and subtropics.

== Region ==
It is found in Sierra Leone, Liberia, Ivory Coast, Ghana, Togo, Benin, Nigeria, Cameroon, Bioko, Angola, the Democratic Republic of the Congo, Sudan, Uganda, Rwanda, Burundi, Ethiopia, Kenya, Tanzania and Zambia.

== Description ==
A. lycoa is a very variable species nearly allied to johnstoni; it differs from this in having the light basal or median area of the hindwing distally rounded or occasionally entirely absent. The fore wing has normally 5-7 white or whitish spots, in the male sometimes dull and very indistinct; the first is placed in 1b close to the distal margin and is quite free and rounded or partly joined to the spot in 2, but never extends so far basad as the latter; the third is placed in 4 near to the distal margin quite free or touching the spot in 5; the spots in 5 and 6 are of equal length, joined to one another and to small spots in cellules 8 and 9; the cell always unicolorous without spots.

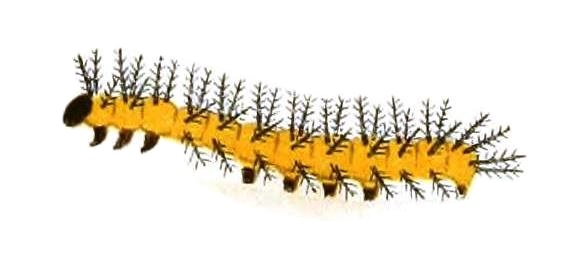
Late instar larva of A. l. lycoa from Lagos, Nigeria, in Eltringham (1912)

- lycoa Godt. both wings thinly scaled, semi-transparent; spots of the forewing indistinct; basal area of the hindwing large, dull reddish yellow, distally rather sharply defined against the grey marginal band. female: wings thinly scaled, dark grey with distinct white markings; marginal band media, of the hindwing broad, not sharply defined. Sierra Leone to Nigeria.
- media Eltr. (57 a, as lycoa). male. Spots of the forewing more distinct; hindwing in the middle somewhat tinged with reddish yellow but without distinct basal area. female with darker ground-colour and sharply defined marginal band on the hindwing. Cameroons to Toro.
- bukoba Eltr. male Forewing dark olive-brown; spots light yellow, sharply defined; basal area of the hindwing ochre-yellow. female similar to the male, but darker, with white or whitish markings. The spot in 1b of the forewing in both sexes entirely free and broadly separated from the spot in 2. Urundi.
- entebbia Eltr. The spot in 1b of the forewing quite free; ground-colour in the male yellowish grey; spots of the forewing small, dull yellowish; basal area of the hind wing small, not reaching the inner margin; ground-colour in the female very dark, spots of the forewing white, basal area of the hindwing whitish yellow. Uganda.
- tirika Eltr. Spot 1b of the forewing widely separated; ground-colour of the fore wing in the olive-brown, in the female very dark, spots small; basal area of the hind wing yellowish. British East Africa.
- fallax Rogenh. (57 c). Ground-colour in both sexes nearly black; spots of the forewing small, in the male yellowish, in the female white, spot 1b widely separated from spot 2; basal area of the hindwing sharply defined, yellowish. German East Africa: Kilimandjaro.
- kenia Eltr. Smaller than the other races; ground-colour nearly black; spots of the forewing in the male lemon-yellow, in the female white; basal area of the hindwing in both sexes lemon-yellow. British East Africa: Kenia; Kikuyu.
- aequalis Rothsch. and Jord. Sexes similar; spots of the forewing and basal area of the hindwing dull yellowish; marginal band of the hindwing yellowish dark brown. Abyssinia.

Torben Larsen developed a species numbering system for his 2005 publication Butterflies of West Africa. The nominate subspecies is #1158. The 'Larsen' numbers have since been used with permission in A Sharp Eye on Butterflies of Ghana.

== Biology ==
The habitat consists of forests.

The larvae feed on Theobroma cacao, Pouzolzia guineensis, Pouzolzia parasitica, Aneilema and Fleurya species.

== Taxonomy ==
It is a member of the Acraea jodutta species group – but see also Pierre & Bernaud, 2014
