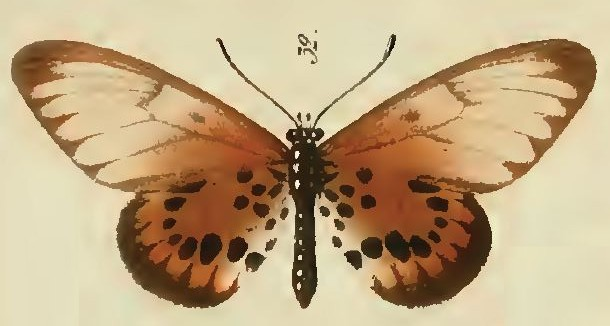

Scientific classification
- Kingdom: Animalia
- Phylum: Arthropoda
- Class: Insecta
- Order: Lepidoptera
- Family: Nymphalidae
- Genus: Acraea
- Species: A. masamba

Binomial name
- Acraea masamba Ward, 1872

Synonyms
- Acraea (Actinote) masamba; Acraea ruepelli Saalmuller, 1878; Acraea boseae Saalmuller, 1880; Acraea masamba r. vulgaris Oberthür, 1916; Acraea masamba f. torquata Le Cerf, 1927

= Acraea masamba =

Species of butterfly

Acraea masamba is a butterfly in the family Nymphalidae. It is found on Madagascar. The habitat consists of forests.

== Description ==
A. masamba Ward (56 g) closely approximates to the two preceding species [ Acraea igola, Acraea strattipocles ], but the red-yellow scaling of the forewing is less extended, leaving the apex of the cell free and covering at most the base of cellule 2; it is much paler in the female than in the male. The hindwing as in strattipocles with large discal dots; the distal black dot in the cell is placed more basally before the origin of vein 2; in the female the ground-colour of the hindwing is often whitish. Madagascar, f. silia Mab. (56 g) [now species Acraea silia] only differs in having the reddish colour of the upper surface more yellowish and behind the discal spots of the hind wing more or less whitish; the sexes almost alike. Madagascar, f. boseae Saalm. (56 g) is smaller, with the ground-colour of the upper surface light yellow. Madagascar.

== Taxonomy ==
It is a member of the Acraea masamba species group. But see also Pierre & Bernaud, 2014.
