= Gyrotaenia =

Scientific classification
- Kingdom: Plantae
- Clade: Tracheophytes
- Clade: Angiosperms
- Clade: Eudicots
- Clade: Rosids
- Order: Rosales
- Family: Urticaceae
- Tribe: Elatostemateae
- Genus: Gyrotaenia; Griseb.

Genus of flowering plants

Gyrotaenia is a genus of plants in the family Urticaceae.

Species include:

- Gyrotaenia microcarpa (Wedd.) F. & R.
- Gyrotaenia spicata (Wedd.) Wedd.
