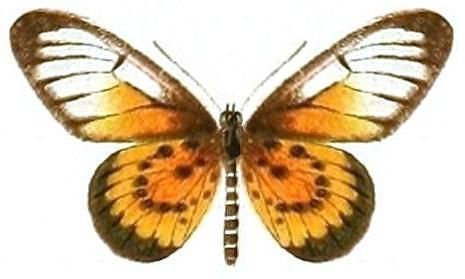
- In Adalbert Seitz's Die Gross-Schmetterlinge der Erde

Scientific classification
- Kingdom: Animalia
- Phylum: Arthropoda
- Class: Insecta
- Order: Lepidoptera
- Family: Nymphalidae
- Genus: Acraea
- Species: A. orestia

Binomial name
- Acraea orestia Hewitson, 1874

Synonyms
- Acraea (Actinote) orestia; Acraea orestina Plötz, 1880; Acraea orestia f. transita Eltringham, 1912; Acraea orestia f. carpenteri Eltringham, 1913; Acraea orestia ab. moliwensis Strand, 1914; Acraea acutipennis Schultze, 1923; Acraea orestia f. clara Stoneham, 1943; Acraea orestia f. pseudohumilis Stoneham, 1943

= Acraea orestia =

Orestia glassy acraea

Species of butterfly

Acraea orestia, the Orestia glassy acraea, is a butterfly in the family Nymphalidae. It is found in Ivory Coast, Ghana, Togo, Nigeria, Cameroon, Equatorial Guinea, Gabon, the Central African Republic, Angola, the Democratic Republic of the Congo, Uganda, Kenya and Tanzania.

== Description ==
A. orestia Hew. (56 g). Forewing diaphanous, at the margins and veins and at the base dark-scaled, cellules 1 a and 1 b to beyond the middle, the base of cellule 2 and usually also a small spot in the cell light orange-yellow to red. Hindwing on both surfaces light orange-yellow with black basal dots and fully developed discal dots and with a sharply defined grey or black semitransparent marginal band. Nigeria to Angola and Uganda. -ab. transita Eltr. Fore wing without reddish scaling; hindwing instead of the red colour yellow or white. Uganda and Tiriki Hills. -ab. humilis E. Sharpe.[ now species Acraea humilis ] Both wings transparent without red or yellow scales and above almost alike; the hindwing beneath at the base with some small black dots, which are not visible above; the discal dots are wanting. A very degenerate form. Uganda and Tiriki.

== Biology ==
The habitat consists of disturbed forests and successional growth.

The larvae feed on Laportea ovalifolia.

== Subspecies ==
- Acraea orestia orestia (Ivory Coast, Ghana, Togo, Nigeria, Cameroon, Bioko, Gabon, Central African Republic, Angola, Democratic Republic of the Congo, Uganda, western Kenya, north-western Tanzania)
- Acraea orestia sambar Stoneham, 1943 (Tanzania: north-east to the Usambara Mountains)

== Taxonomy ==
It is a member of the Acraea pentapolis species group. - but see also Pierre & Bernaud, 2014
