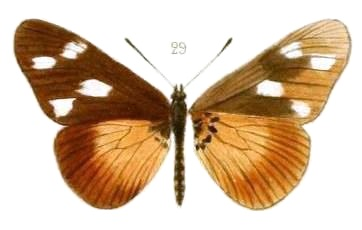
- Imago of the nominate race, illustrated in Oberthür (1893)

Scientific classification
- Kingdom: Animalia
- Phylum: Arthropoda
- Clade: Pancrustacea
- Class: Insecta
- Order: Lepidoptera
- Family: Nymphalidae
- Genus: Acraea
- Species: A. johnstoni

Binomial name
- Acraea johnstoni Godman, 1885

Synonyms
- Acraea (Actinote) johnstoni; Planema confusa Rogenhofer, 1891; Planema telekiana Rogenhofer, 1891; Acraea proteina Oberthür, 1893; Acraea proteina var. flavescens Oberthür, 1893; Acraea proteina var. semialbescens Oberthür, 1893; Acraea proteina var. fulvescens Oberthür, 1893; Acraea proteina var. semifulvescens Oberthür, 1893; Acraea octobalia Karsch, 1894; Acraea silvicola Richelmann, 1913; Acraea johnstoni f. valdemaculosa Carpenter, 1932; Acraea johnstoni f. pretiosa Carpenter, 1932

= Acraea johnstoni =

Johnston's acraea

Species of butterfly

Acraea johnstoni, or Johnston's acraea, is a species of butterfly in the family Nymphalidae that is native to East Africa.

== Range ==
It is found in southern Sudan, northern Uganda, Ethiopia, Kenya, Tanzania, Malawi, Zambia, western Mozambique and eastern Zimbabwe.

== Description ==
A. johnstoni, only differs from lycoa in not having the basal area of the hindwing uniformly rounded distally, but more or less projecting or angled in cellule 4; this character is especially pronounced on the under surface. The species is no less variable than lycoa; the light spots of the fore wing are light yellow or white and the spot in 1b is placed quite free; the forms are connected by intermediates. Palpus yellowish.

- johnstoni Godm. (57 d). The black ground-colour of the forewing above is restricted to the base and the distal margin, being covered in the middle by a very broad orange-yellow band, irregularly defined distally, which reaches the light yellow spots, but extends scarcely or not at all beyond them; hindwing with white basal area and broad black marginal band. German and British East Africa.
- f. fulvescens Oberth. Both wings above pale orange-yellow as far as the narrow marginal band, which has an almost uniform breadth of 2–3 mm.; spots of the forewing and basal area of the hindwing somewhat lighter yellow. German and British East Africa.

The following forms agree with one another in having the ground-colour of the fore wing above uniform black-brown without orange-yellow median band.

- f. confusa Rogenh. Spots of the forewing white; basal area of the hindwing light ochre-yellow with broad black marginal band as in the type-form; is confusingly similar to f. fallax of lycoa and commoner than the type-form. Nyassaland to British East Africa and Uganda.
- f. flavescens Oberth. Both the spots of the forewing and the basal area of the hindwing light ochre-yellow; otherwise similar to f. confusa and with the same distribution.
- f. semialbescens Oberth. only differs from confusa in having the basal area of the hindwing brown-yellow. Nyassaland and German East Africa.
- f. octobalia Karsch. Spots of the forewing and basal area of the hindwing brown-yellow. German East Africa.

A. butleri Auriv. (= toruna Sm.). This species [now johnstoni subspecies] also is regarded by Eltringham as a form of johnstoni. Although the male genitalia are formed as in johnstoni it seems to me better for the present and until transitional forms have been discovered to cite butleri as a separate species, as it differs from johnstoni in the black palpus and in having the spots of the forewing quite differently developed. The spots of the forewing bright yellow; that in 4 is placed with its outer end almost as near to the distal margin as the same spot in johnstoni but is proximally long-produced and broadly united with the spot in 5; in addition the spot in 1b is joined to the one in 2 and similar spots usually occur in 3 and 1a also; hence all the light spots of the forewing are united into a yellow transverse band, which is placed behind the cell, leaves the base of cellules 2-6 free, extends from the posterior to the costal margin and has distally two large excisions (in 1b and 4); basal part of the forewing wing bright red-brown as far as the transverse band, at the base more or less blackish. Basal area of the hindwing white, yellowish or reddish; marginal band broad. German East Africa and Toro.

== Biology ==
The habitat consists of montane forests.

Adults are on wing year round.

The larvae feed on Pouzolzia parasitica, Urera trinervis, Laportea and Boehmeria species (all Urticaceae).

== Subspecies ==
- A. johnstoni johnstoni
- A. johnstoni butleri Aurivillius, 1898

== Taxonomy ==
It is a member of the Acraea jodutta species group – but see also Pierre & Bernaud, 2014.
