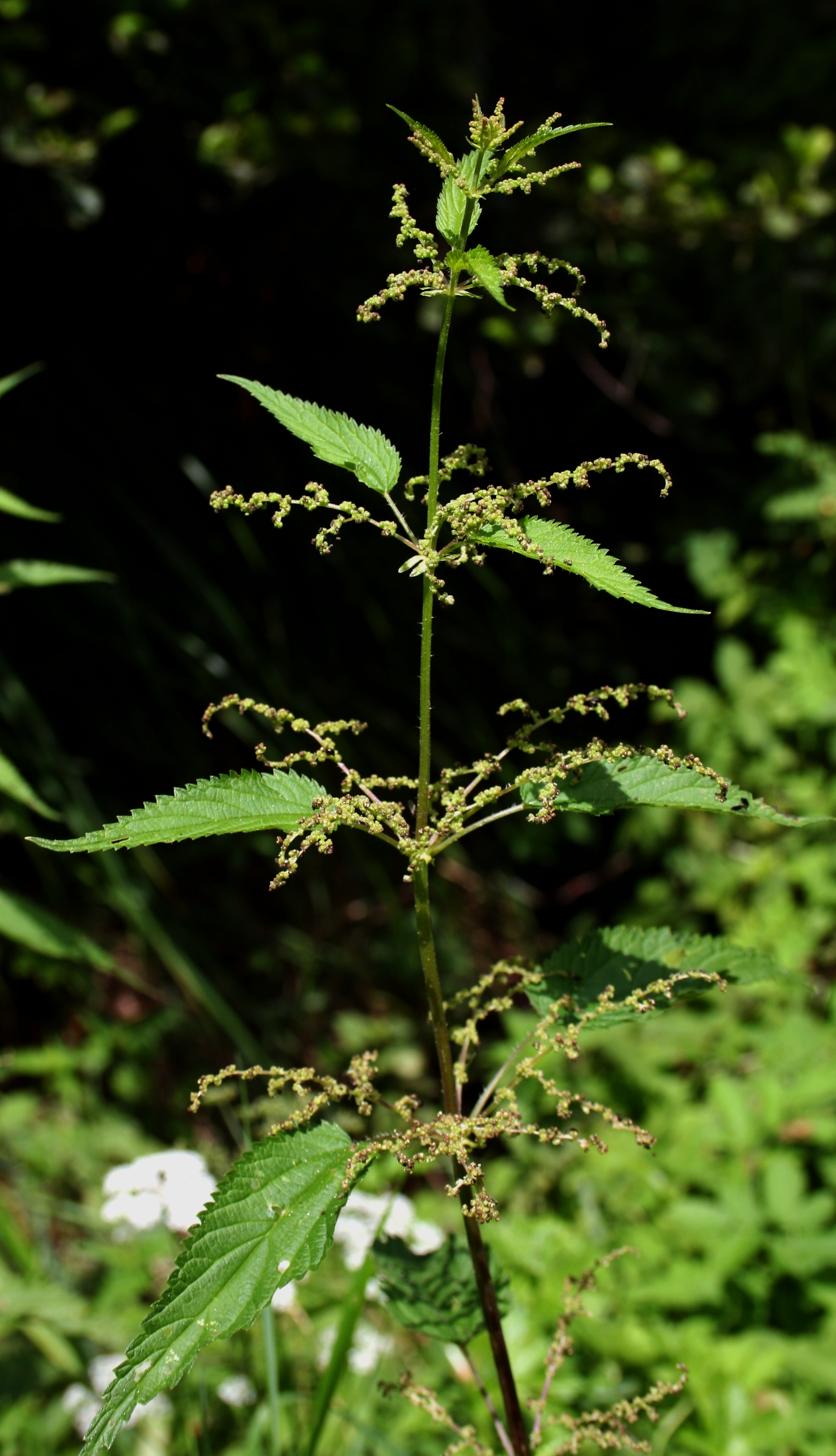
- Urtica dioica

Scientific classification
- Kingdom: Plantae
- Clade: Tracheophytes
- Clade: Angiosperms
- Clade: Eudicots
- Clade: Rosids
- Order: Rosales
- Family: Urticaceae
- Tribe: Urticeae; Lamarck & DC.

= Urticeae =

Tribe of flowering plants

Urticeae also known as Urereae is a tribe of flowering plants in the family Urticaceae. It is among the most conspicuous members of the Urticaceae. It has more than 10 genera and approximately 220 species.

== Description ==
Species of this tribe, especially the genera Urtica, Laportea and Dendrocnide have stinging hairs. Only the genera Poikilospermum and Touchardia do not have stinging hairs.

== Gallery ==
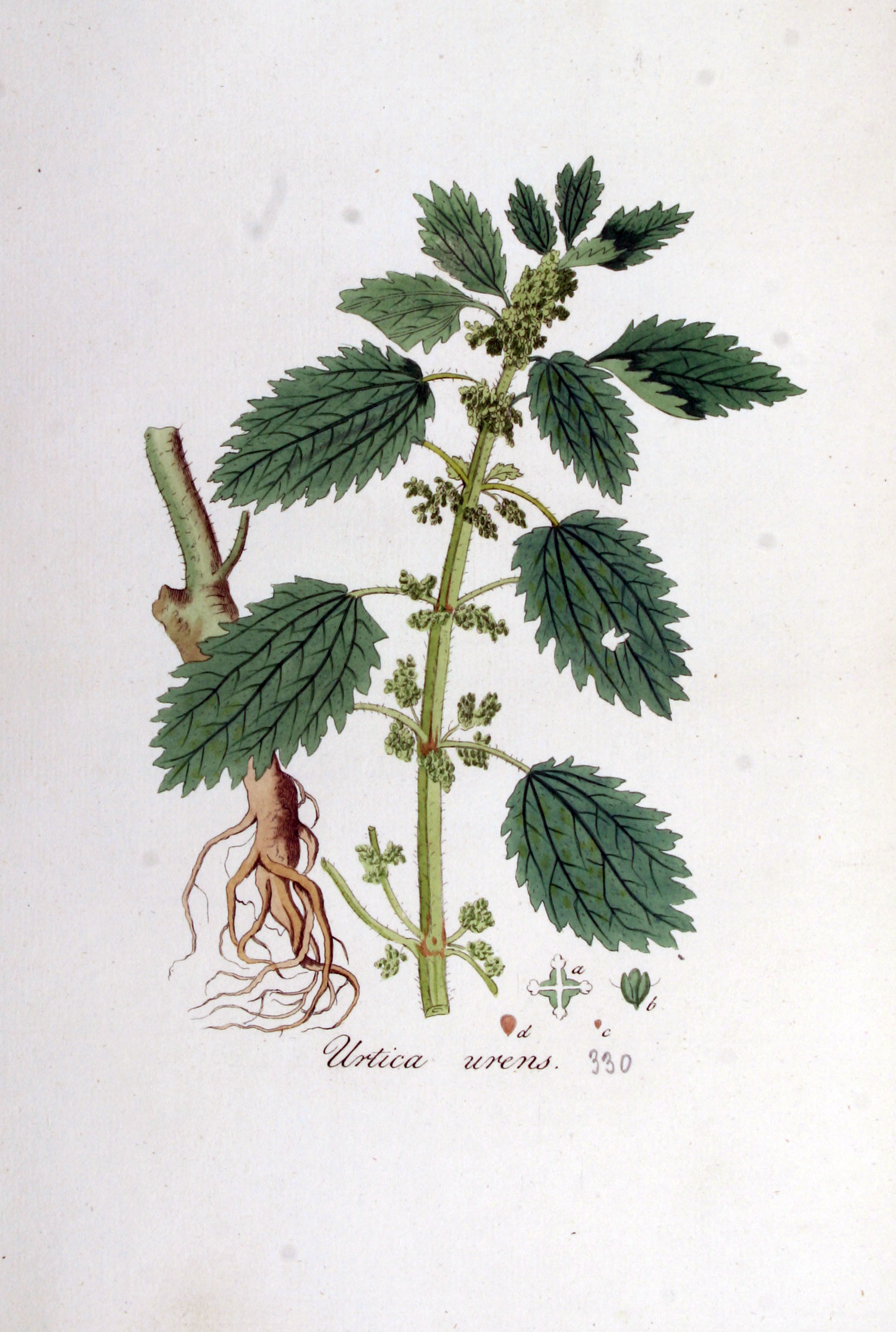
Urtica urens

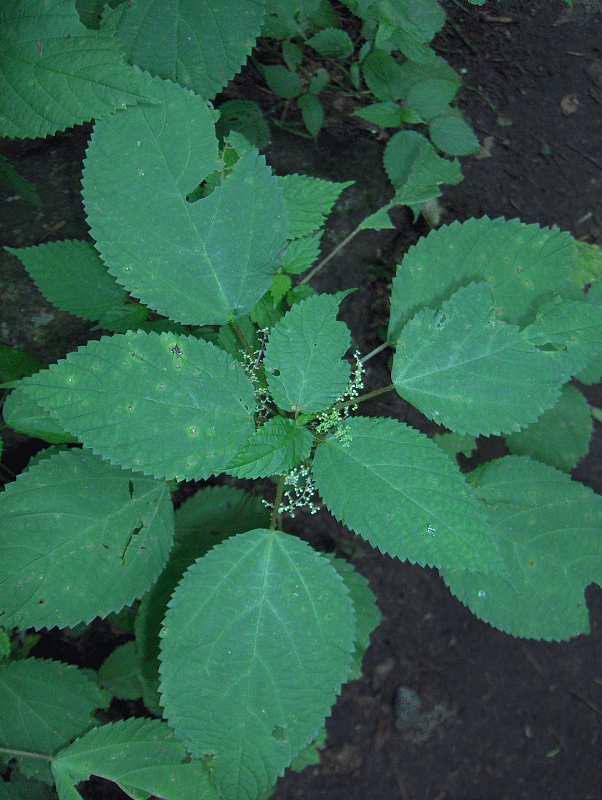
Laportea canadensis

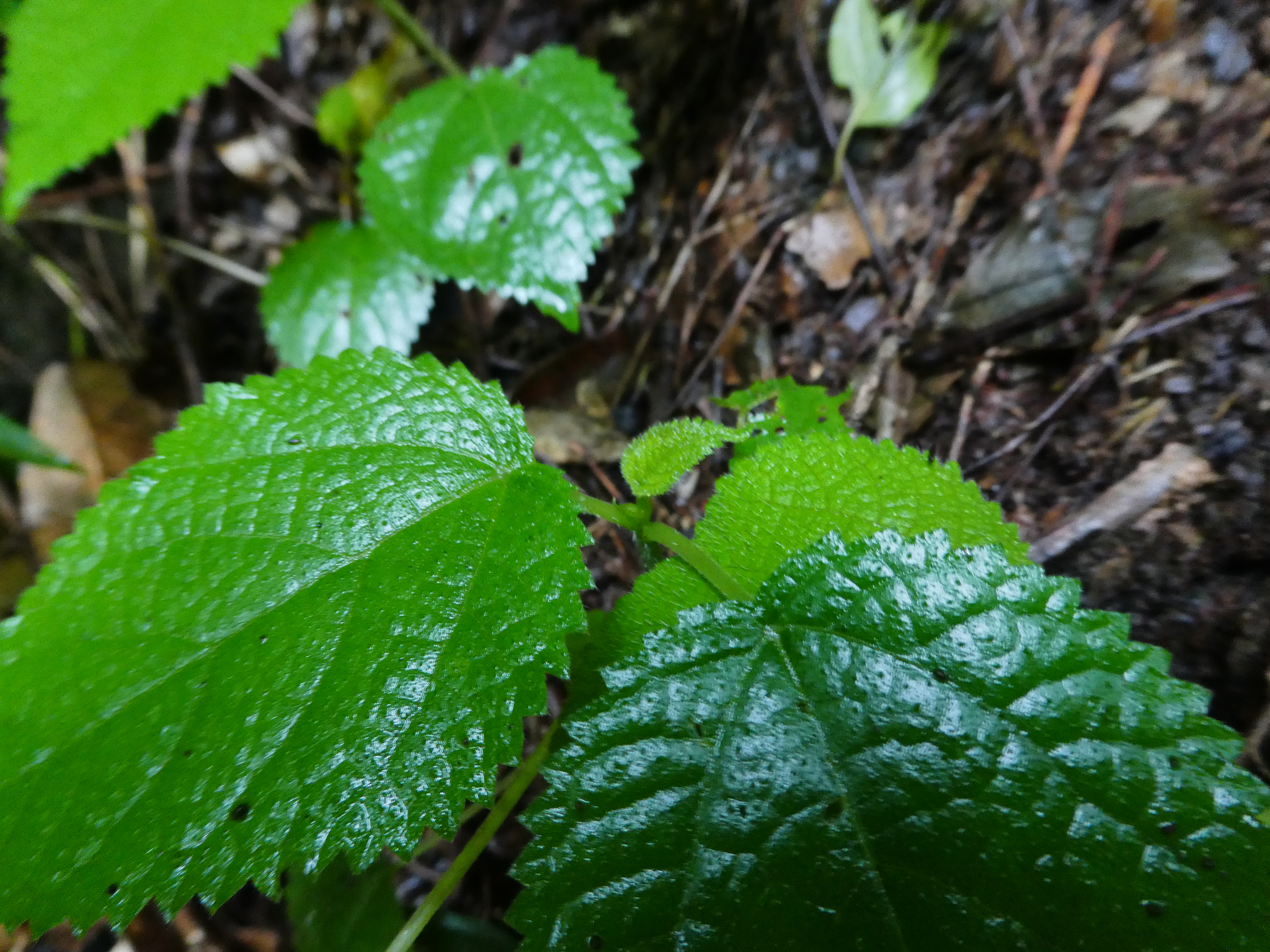
Dendrocnide moroides

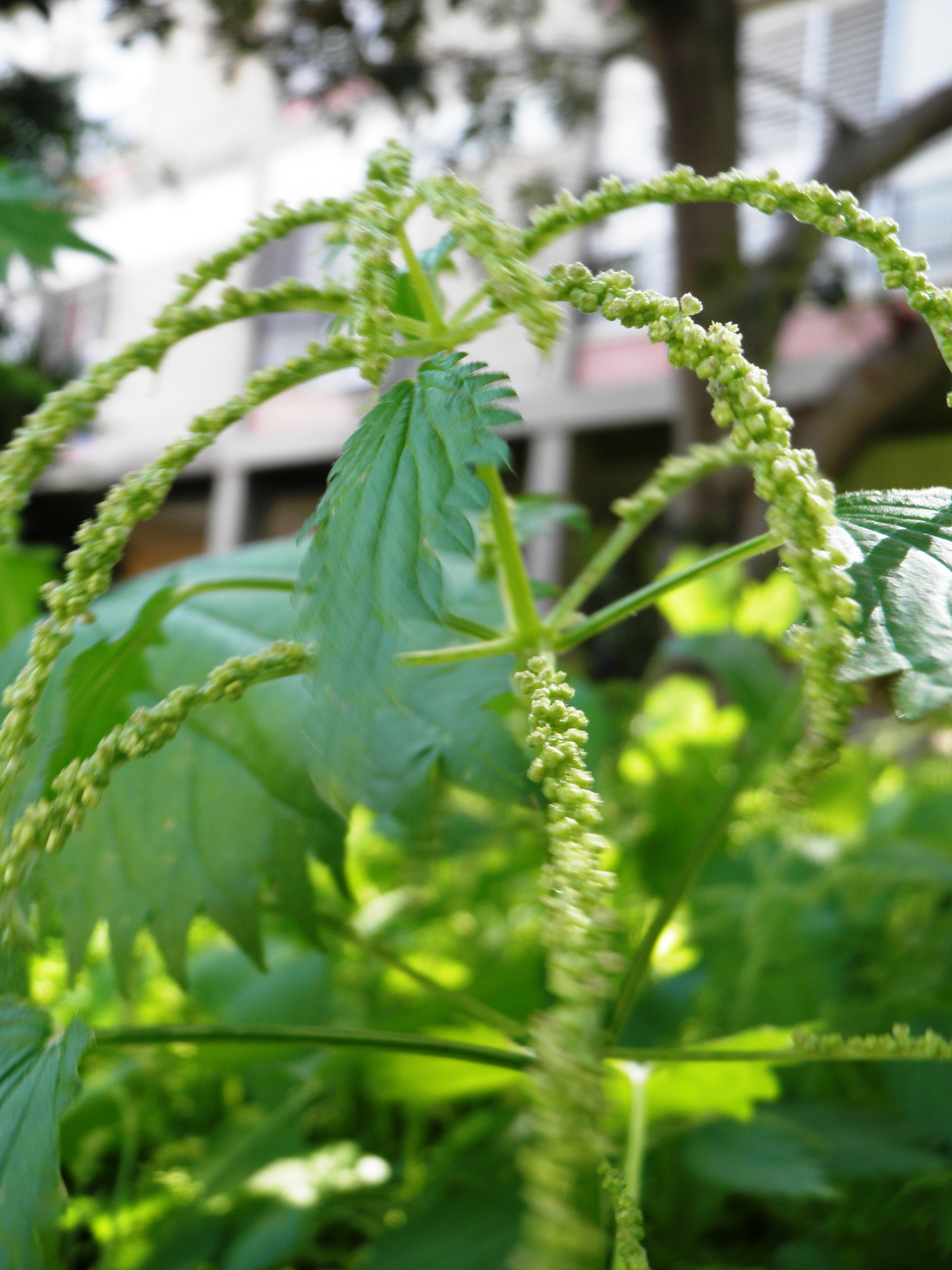
Urtica membranacea
