= List of Pilea species =

Pilea is a genus of flowering plants in the nettle family Urticaceae with a worldwide distribution. As of May 2025, Plants of the World Online accepts the following 614 species:

== A-B ==
- Pilea abbreviata Urb. & Ekman
- Pilea acanthoides F.S.Cabral & Gaglioti
- Pilea acanthospermoides Urb. & Ekman
- Pilea acuminata Liebm.
- Pilea acunae Grudz.
- Pilea adamsiana A.K.Monro
- Pilea aenea Killip
- Pilea affinis C.V.Morton
- Pilea alaotrae Leandri
- Pilea alfaroana Al.Rodr. & A.K.Monro
- Pilea alongensis Gagnep.
- Pilea alpestris (Urb.) Fawc. & Rendle
- Pilea alpina Urb.
- Pilea alsinifolia Wedd.
- Pilea alta Gilli
- Pilea alternifolia Urb. & Ekman
- Pilea ambecarpa Urb.
- Pilea amplistipulata C.J.Chen
- Pilea andersonii C.D.Adams
- Pilea andringitrensis Leandri
- Pilea angolensis (Hiern) Rendle
- Pilea angulata (Blume) Blume
- Pilea angustata Killip
- Pilea angustifolia Killip
- Pilea anisophylla Wedd.
- Pilea ansincola Urb. & Ekman
- Pilea anthotricha Urb.
- Pilea antioquensis Killip
- Pilea aparadensis P.Brack
- Pilea apiculata Killip
- Pilea apoensis Elmer
- Pilea appendicilata Fawc. & Rendle
- Pilea approximata C.B.Clarke
- Pilea aquarum Dunn
- Pilea arbuscula Ridl.
- Pilea argentea Killip
- Pilea arguta (Kunth) Wedd.
- Pilea articulata Wedd.
- Pilea astrogramma Miq.
- Pilea atroviridis Baker
- Pilea attenuata Killip
- Pilea auricularis C.J.Chen
- Pilea auriculata Liebm.
- Pilea australis L.F.Fu & A.K.Monro
- Pilea bakeriana R.Kr.Singh, Deroliya & Sanjeet Kumar
- Pilea balansae Gagnep.
- Pilea balfourii Baker
- Pilea baltenweckii Urb.
- Pilea bambuseti Engl.
- Pilea bambusifolia C.J.Chen
- Pilea barahonensis Urb.
- Pilea barbiflora Urb. & Ekman
- Pilea basicordata W.T.Wang
- Pilea bassleriana Killip
- Pilea baurii B.L.Rob.
- Pilea beguinotii Cufod.
- Pilea bemarivensis Leandri
- Pilea benguetensis C.B.Rob.
- Pilea betulifolia (Sw.) Wedd.
- Pilea bicolor Urb.
- Pilea bisepala H.St.John
- Pilea bissei Grudz.
- Pilea boehmerioides Wedd.
- Pilea boiviniana Wedd.
- Pilea borbonica Marais
- Pilea botterii Killip
- Pilea brachypila Urb.
- Pilea bracteosa Wedd.
- Pilea bradei J.F.Soares
- Pilea brasiliensis Gaglioti, Romaniuc & A.K.Monro
- Pilea brassii Chew ex P.Royen
- Pilea brevicornuta Hayata
- Pilea brevipetiolata Urb. & Ekman
- Pilea brevistipula Urb.
- Pilea brittoniae Urb.
- Pilea buchenavii Urb.
- Pilea buchtienii Killip
- Pilea bullata Britton
- Pilea butaudiana Lorence & W.L.Wagner

== C ==
- Pilea cacuminum Urb. & Ekman
- Pilea cadetii Marais
- Pilea cadierei Gagnep. & Guillaumin
- Pilea caespitosa Urb.
- Pilea calcicola C.B.Rob.
- Pilea callicometes Leandri
- Pilea cangyuanensis H.W.Li
- Pilea capitata Baker
- Pilea capitellata Wedd.
- Pilea carautae M.D.M.Vianna & R.J.V.Alves
- Pilea cardiophylla Urb.
- Pilea caribaea Urb.
- Pilea carnosa Britton
- Pilea carnosula Wedd.
- Pilea castronis Killip
- Pilea cataractae Marais
- Pilea caudata H.J.P.Winkl.
- Pilea caulescens (L.) Urb.
- Pilea cavaleriei H.Lév.
- Pilea cavernicola A.K.Monro, C.J.Chen & Y.G.Wei
- Pilea celebica Miq.
- Pilea cellulosa (Spreng.) Urb.
- Pilea centradenioides Seem.
- Pilea cephalantha Wedd.
- Pilea cephalophora Urb.
- Pilea ceratocalyx Wedd.
- Pilea chamaesyce Urb. & Ekman
- Pilea chartacea C.J.Chen
- Pilea chiapensis Killip
- Pilea chotardiana Urb. & Ekman
- Pilea christii Urb.
- Pilea ciliata (Sw.) Blume
- Pilea citriodora Wedd.
- Pilea clandestina Wedd.
- Pilea clarana Urb.
- Pilea clarkei Hook.f.
- Pilea clementis Britton
- Pilea cocottei Marais
- Pilea confusa C.V.Morton
- Pilea conjugalis A.K.Monro
- Pilea consanguinea Wedd.
- Pilea cordifolia Hook.f.
- Pilea cordistipulata C.J.Chen
- Pilea cornutocucullata Cufod.
- Pilea corona A.K.Monro
- Pilea coronopifolia Urb. & Ekman
- Pilea corymbosa (Savigny) Blume
- Pilea costaricensis Donn.Sm.
- Pilea costata Killip
- Pilea cowellii Britton
- Pilea craspedodroma A.K.Monro
- Pilea crassifolia (Willd.) Blume
- Pilea crenata Britton & P.Wilson
- Pilea crenulata (Sw.) Urb.
- Pilea cruegeriana Wedd.
- Pilea cubensis Wedd.
- Pilea cuneata H.J.P.Winkl.
- Pilea cuneiformis (Savigny) Wedd.
- Pilea cuprea K.Krause
- Pilea cushiensis Killip
- Pilea cyclophylla Urb. & Ekman
- Pilea cymbifolia Rusby

== D-G ==
- Pilea daguensis Killip
- Pilea danxiaensis L.F.Fu, A.K.Monro & Y.G.Wei
- Pilea dataensis C.B.Rob.
- Pilea dauciodora Pav. ex Wedd.
- Pilea delicatula Killip
- Pilea densiflora Kunth
- Pilea depressa (Sw.) Blume
- Pilea diandra Urb.
- Pilea dictyocarpa Urb.
- Pilea diffusa (Sw.) Wedd.
- Pilea digitata A.K.Monro
- Pilea discolor Killip
- Pilea dispar Urb.
- Pilea distantifolia Urb.
- Pilea diversifolia Wedd.
- Pilea dolichocarpa C.J.Chen
- Pilea dombeyana Wedd.
- Pilea domingensis Urb.
- Pilea ecboliophylla Donn.Sm.
- Pilea effusa H.J.P.Winkl.
- Pilea ekmanii Urb.
- Pilea elegans Gay
- Pilea elegantissima C.J.Chen
- Pilea elizabethae Fawc. & Rendle
- Pilea elliptica Hook.f.
- Pilea elliptilimba C.J.Chen
- Pilea entradana Philipson
- Pilea ermitensis Britton
- Pilea erosa Urb.
- Pilea fairchildiana Jestrow & Jiménez Rodr.
- Pilea falcata Liebm.
- Pilea fallax Wedd.
- Pilea fasciata Wedd.
- Pilea fendleri Killip
- Pilea filicina Killip
- Pilea filipes Rusby
- Pilea flammula P.Brack
- Pilea flavicaulis Urb. & Britton
- Pilea flexuosa Wedd.
- Pilea floridana Urb.
- Pilea foetida Urb. & Ekman
- Pilea foliosa Killip
- Pilea fontana (Lunell) Rydb.
- Pilea foreroi A.H.Gentry
- Pilea forgetii N.E.Br.
- Pilea formonensis Urb. & Ekman
- Pilea formosa Urb.
- Pilea forsythiana Wedd.
- Pilea frutescens Urb.
- Pilea fruticosa Hook.f.
- Pilea fruticulosa C.V.Morton
- Pilea funkikensis Hayata
- Pilea gallowayana Killip
- Pilea gamboana Al.Rodr. & A.K.Monro
- Pilea gansuensis C.J.Chen & Z.X.Peng
- Pilea geminata Urb.
- Pilea gesnerioides Grudz.
- Pilea glaberrima (Blume) Blume
- Pilea glabra S.Watson
- Pilea glomerata Griseb.
- Pilea gnidioides Griseb.
- Pilea godetiana Urb. & Ekman
- Pilea goetzei Engl.
- Pilea gomeziana W.C.Burger
- Pilea gongjueensis W.T.Wang
- Pilea goudotiana Wedd.
- Pilea gracilior Urb. & Ekman
- Pilea gracilis Hand.-Mazz.
- Pilea grandifolia (L.) Blume
- Pilea granmae Grudz.
- Pilea granulata Urb. & Ekman
- Pilea griffithii Blume
- Pilea guanwuensis S.S.Ying
- Pilea guirana Urb.
- Pilea guizhouensis A.K.Monro, C.J.Chen & Y.G.Wei
- Pilea gyrophylla Urb.

== H-L ==
- Pilea haenkei Killip
- Pilea hamaoi Makino
- Pilea harrisii Urb.
- Pilea hedemarkii W.N.Takeuchi
- Pilea helwigii Urb. & Ekman
- Pilea helxinoides Ridl.
- Pilea hemisphaerica Urb. & Ekman
- Pilea hepatica Urb. & Ekman
- Pilea herniarioides (Sw.) Lindl.
- Pilea herrerae Al.Rodr. & A.K.Monro
- Pilea heteroneura Griseb.
- Pilea hexagona C.J.Chen
- Pilea hilariana Wedd.
- Pilea hirsuta Wedd.
- Pilea hirtella Miq.
- Pilea hispaniolana Acev.-Rodr.
- Pilea hitchcockii Killip
- Pilea holstii Engl.
- Pilea hookeriana Wedd.
- Pilea howardiana Skean & Judd
- Pilea howelliana Hand.-Mazz.
- Pilea humbertii Leandri
- Pilea humilis C.B.Rob.
- Pilea hyalina Fenzl
- Pilea hydra P.Brack
- Pilea hydrocotyliflora Killip
- Pilea hygrophila (Miq.) Blume
- Pilea imitans Beutelsp. & R.García Mart.
- Pilea imparifolia Wedd.
- Pilea impressa Urb.
- Pilea inaequalis (Juss. ex Poir.) Wedd.
- Pilea insolens Wedd.
- Pilea intermedia (Wedd.) Urb.
- Pilea intumescens C.B.Rob.
- Pilea involucrata (Sims) C.H.Wright & Dewar
- Pilea irrorata Donn.Sm.
- Pilea iteophylla Urb. & Ekman
- Pilea ivohibeensis Leandri
- Pilea jamesoniana Wedd.
- Pilea jayaensis A.K.Monro
- Pilea jeremiensis Urb. & Ekman
- Pilea johniana Stapf
- Pilea johnsii A.K.Monro
- Pilea johnstonii Oliv.
- Pilea jujuyensis Sorarú
- Pilea kakurang Blume
- Pilea kanaii H.Hara
- Pilea killipiana Standl. & Steyerm.
- Pilea kingii C.E.C.Fisch.
- Pilea kiotensis Ohwi
- Pilea klossii A.K.Monro
- Pilea krugii Urb.
- Pilea laciniata Urb.
- Pilea lacorum P.Royen
- Pilea laevicaulis Wedd.
- Pilea lageensis W.T.Wang
- Pilea lamii H.J.P.Winkl.
- Pilea lamiifolia Fawc. & Rendle
- Pilea lamioides Wedd.
- Pilea lanceolata (Savigny) Wedd.
- Pilea lancifolia Hook.f.
- Pilea lapestris Chew ex A.K.Monro
- Pilea latifolia Wedd.
- Pilea laurea C.D.Adams
- Pilea laxa (Sw.) Wedd.
- Pilea ledermannii H.J.P.Winkl.
- Pilea leptocardia Urb.
- Pilea leptogramma Urb.
- Pilea leptophylla Urb.
- Pilea leucophaea (Blume) Blume
- Pilea libanensis Urb.
- Pilea lidaoensis S.S.Ying
- Pilea lindeniana Wedd.
- Pilea linearifolia C.J.Chen
- Pilea lippioides Killip
- Pilea lobulata Urb.
- Pilea loeseneri Urb. & Ekman
- Pilea loheri Merr.
- Pilea lokohensis Leandri
- Pilea lomatogramma Hand.-Mazz.
- Pilea longibracteolata Al.Rodr., A.K.Monro & L.Acosta
- Pilea longicaulis Hand.-Mazz.
- Pilea longifolia Baker
- Pilea longipedunculata S.S.Chien & C.J.Chen
- Pilea longruiensis W.T.Wang
- Pilea longzhouensis W.T.Wang
- Pilea losensis Killip
- Pilea loshanensis S.S.Ying
- Pilea lucens (Savigny) Wedd.
- Pilea lucida (Sw.) Blume
- Pilea luisiana Urb. & Ekman
- Pilea luochengensis W.T.Wang
- Pilea lurida C.Wright
- Pilea lushuiensis W.T.Wang
- Pilea luzonensis Merr.

== M-O ==
- Pilea macbridei Killip
- Pilea macrantha Killip
- Pilea macrocarpa C.J.Chen
- Pilea macrocystolithica Killip
- Pilea maculata Urb. & Ekman
- Pilea magnicarpa A.K.Monro
- Pilea manniana Wedd.
- Pilea margarettae Britton
- Pilea marginata Wedd.
- Pilea martini (H.Lév.) Hand.-Mazz.
- Pilea matama A.K.Monro
- Pilea matheuxiana Urb. & Ekman
- Pilea matsudae Yamam.
- Pilea matthewii Dorr & Stergios
- Pilea maxonii Britton
- Pilea mayarensis C.V.Morton
- Pilea media C.J.Chen
- Pilea mediophylla Gilli
- Pilea medongensis C.J.Chen
- Pilea melastomoides (Poir.) Wedd.
- Pilea menghaiensis C.J.Chen
- Pilea mexicana Wedd.
- Pilea michaelensis P.Royen
- Pilea microcardia Hand.-Mazz.
- Pilea micromeriifolia Britton & P.Wilson
- Pilea microphylla (L.) Liebm.
- Pilea microrhombea Urb.
- Pilea miguelii Dorr & Stergios
- Pilea mimema Standl. & Steyerm.
- Pilea minguetii Urb.
- Pilea minima W.T.Wang
- Pilea minuta C.B.Clarke
- Pilea minutiflora K.Krause
- Pilea minutissima H.J.P.Winkl.
- Pilea mollis Wedd.
- Pilea mongolica Wedd.
- Pilea monilifera Hand.-Mazz.
- Pilea monticola C.B.Rob.
- Pilea montis-wilhelmi P.Royen
- Pilea moragana Al.Rodr. & A.K.Monro
- Pilea moroniana Urb.
- Pilea multicaulis Urb.
- Pilea multicellularis C.J.Chen
- Pilea multiflora (Poir.) Wedd.
- Pilea mutisiana (Spreng.) Wedd.
- Pilea myriantha Killip
- Pilea myriophylla Killip
- Pilea nana Liebm.
- Pilea napoana Gilli
- Pilea neglecta Britton
- Pilea nerteroides Killip
- Pilea nguruensis Friis & I.Darbysh.
- Pilea nicholasii Dorr & Stergios
- Pilea nidiae Dorr & Stergios
- Pilea nigrescens Urb.
- Pilea nipensis Urb.
- Pilea nitida Wedd.
- Pilea nonggangensis Y.G.Wei, L.F.Fu & A.K.Monro
- Pilea notata C.H.Wright
- Pilea nudicaulis (Sw.) Wedd.
- Pilea nummulariifolia (Sw.) Wedd.
- Pilea nutans Wedd.
- Pilea obetiifolia Killip
- Pilea oblanceolata Fawc. & Rendle
- Pilea obscura C.V.Morton
- Pilea obtusangula Urb.
- Pilea occulta J.Florence
- Pilea ophioderma Killip
- Pilea ophiticola Borhidi
- Pilea ordinata C.D.Adams
- Pilea orientalis C.V.Morton
- Pilea ornatifolia Killip
- Pilea ovalifolia Britton & P.Wilson
- Pilea ovalis Griseb.
- Pilea oxyodon Wedd.

== P-R ==
- Pilea pachycarpa Wedd.
- Pilea pachycephala Urb.
- Pilea pallida Killip
- Pilea palustris Urb.
- Pilea pandurata P.Royen
- Pilea paniculigera C.J.Chen
- Pilea pansamalana Donn.Sm.
- Pilea panzhihuaensis C.J.Chen, A.K.Monro & L.Chen
- Pilea papuana H.J.P.Winkl.
- Pilea parciflora Urb.
- Pilea parietaria (L.) Blume
- Pilea pauciflora C.J.Chen
- Pilea pauciserrata Killip
- Pilea pavonii Wedd.
- Pilea pedroi Grudz.
- Pilea peladerosi Grudz.
- Pilea pellionioides C.J.Chen
- Pilea peltata Hance
- Pilea pennellii Killip
- Pilea penninervis C.J.Chen
- Pilea peperomioides Diels
- Pilea peploides (Gaudich.) Hook. & Arn.
- Pilea perfragilis Ekman
- Pilea perrieri Leandri
- Pilea phaeocarpa Urb.
- Pilea pichisana Killip
- Pilea picta Herzog
- Pilea pitresia Urb. & Ekman
- Pilea pittieri Killip
- Pilea plataniflora C.H.Wright
- Pilea pleuroneura Donn.Sm.
- Pilea plicatidentata H.J.P.Winkl.
- Pilea plumieri Urb.
- Pilea plumulosa A.K.Monro
- Pilea poeppigiana Wedd.
- Pilea pollicaris Marais
- Pilea polyclada Urb.
- Pilea portlandiana C.D.Adams
- Pilea proctorii C.D.Adams
- Pilea propinqua Wedd.
- Pilea pseudonotata C.J.Chen
- Pilea psilogyne Urb.
- Pilea pteridophylla A.K.Monro
- Pilea pterocaulis Stapf
- Pilea pteropodon Wedd.
- Pilea pubescens Liebm.
- Pilea pulchra C.V.Morton
- Pilea pulegifolia (Poir.) Wedd.
- Pilea pumila A.Gray
- Pilea pumileoides Urb.
- Pilea punctata (Kunth) Wedd.
- Pilea puracensis Killip
- Pilea purpurea Killip
- Pilea purulensis Donn.Sm.
- Pilea pusilla K.Krause
- Pilea putridicola Urb. & Ekman
- Pilea pyrrhotricha Miq.
- Pilea quadrata A.K.Monro
- Pilea quercifolia Killip
- Pilea racemiformis C.J.Chen
- Pilea racemosa (Royle) Tuyama
- Pilea radicans (Sw.) Wedd.
- Pilea radiculosa Urb.
- Pilea ramosissima Killip
- Pilea receptacularis C.J.Chen
- Pilea refracta Urb.
- Pilea repanda Wedd.
- Pilea reticulata (Sw.) Wedd.
- Pilea rhexioides Liebm.
- Pilea rhizobola Miq.
- Pilea rhombea (L.f.) Liebm.
- Pilea rhombifolia Killip
- Pilea richardii Urb.
- Pilea riedlei (Decne.) Blume
- Pilea rigida C.B.Rob.
- Pilea rigidiuscula C.B.Rob.
- Pilea riopalenquensis A.H.Gentry & Dodson
- Pilea riparia Donn.Sm.
- Pilea rivoriae Wedd.
- Pilea rivularis Wedd.
- Pilea robinsonii Elmer
- Pilea robusta Liebm.
- Pilea roemeri H.J.P.Winkl.
- Pilea rojasiana Killip
- Pilea rostellata C.J.Chen
- Pilea rostulata A.K.Monro
- Pilea rotundata Griseb.
- Pilea rotundinucula Hayata
- Pilea royenii R.Kr.Singh, Deroliya & Sanjeet Kumar
- Pilea rubiacea Ridl.
- Pilea rubriflora C.H.Wright
- Pilea rufa (Sw.) Wedd.
- Pilea rufescens Fawc. & Rendle
- Pilea rugosa (Sw.) Wedd.
- Pilea rugosissima Killip
- Pilea rusbyi (Britton) Killip

== S ==
- Pilea salentana Killip
- Pilea salwinensis (Hand.-Mazz.) C.J.Chen
- Pilea samanensis Urb.
- Pilea sanctae-crucis Liebm.
- Pilea sancti-johannis J.Florence
- Pilea saxicola Urb.
- Pilea scandens Killip
- Pilea schimpffii Diels
- Pilea schlechteri H.J.P.Winkl.
- Pilea scripta (Buch.-Ham. ex D.Don) Wedd.
- Pilea selbyanorum Dodson & A.H.Gentry
- Pilea selleana Urb.
- Pilea semidentata (Juss. ex Poir.) Wedd.
- Pilea semisessilis Hand.-Mazz.
- Pilea senarifolia Donn.Sm.
- Pilea serpyllacea (Kunth) Liebm.
- Pilea serpyllifolia (Poir.) Wedd.
- Pilea serratifolia Wedd.
- Pilea serrulata (Sw.) Wedd.
- Pilea sessiliflora (Sw.) Wedd.
- Pilea sessilifolia (Savigny) Wedd.
- Pilea setigera Urb.
- Pilea sevillensis Britton
- Pilea shaferi Britton & P.Wilson ex León & Alain
- Pilea shizongensis A.K.Monro, C.J.Chen & Y.G.Wei
- Pilea siguaneana Britton
- Pilea silvicola Fawc. & Rendle
- Pilea simplex Urb.
- Pilea sinocrassifolia C.J.Chen
- Pilea sinofasciata C.J.Chen
- Pilea skutchii Killip
- Pilea solandri (Seem.) J.Florence
- Pilea somae Hayata
- Pilea spathulata Griseb.
- Pilea spathulifolia Groult
- Pilea sphenophylla Urb.
- Pilea spinulosa C.J.Chen
- Pilea spruceana Wedd.
- Pilea squamosa C.J.Chen
- Pilea squamulata Urb. & Ekman
- Pilea stapfiana Gibbs
- Pilea stellarioides H.J.P.Winkl.
- Pilea stelluligera Wedd.
- Pilea stenoneura H.J.P.Winkl.
- Pilea stenophylla Urb.
- Pilea stolonifera (Sw.) Wedd.
- Pilea striata Urb.
- Pilea strigillosa Urb. & Ekman
- Pilea strigosa Wedd.
- Pilea subamplexicaulis Killip
- Pilea subcoriacea (Hand.-Mazz.) C.J.Chen
- Pilea subedentata C.J.Chen
- Pilea subintegerrima (Griseb.) Greuter & R.Rankin
- Pilea sublobata Rusby
- Pilea sublucens Wedd.
- Pilea submissa Wedd.
- Pilea succulenta Wedd.
- Pilea suffruticosa K.Krause
- Pilea sumideroensis Britton
- Pilea supersedens (Leandri) Leandri
- Pilea suta C.D.Adams
- Pilea swinglei Merr.
- Pilea sykesii (J.Florence) L.F.Fu & A.K.Monro
- Pilea sylvatica Elmer
- Pilea symmeria Wedd.

== T-Z ==
- Pilea tabularis C.C.Berg
- Pilea taiwanensis S.S.Ying
- Pilea tatamensis Killip
- Pilea tatei Killip
- Pilea tenebrosa F.S.Cabral & Gaglioti
- Pilea tenerrima Miq.
- Pilea ternifolia Wedd.
- Pilea tetraphylla (Steud.) Blume
- Pilea tetrapoda Killip
- Pilea thouarsiana Wedd.
- Pilea thymoidea H.J.P.Winkl.
- Pilea tilarana W.C.Burger
- Pilea tippenhaueri Urb.
- Pilea tobagensis Urb.
- Pilea topensis Diels
- Pilea torbeciana Urb. & Ekman
- Pilea trianthemoides (Sw.) Lindl.
- Pilea trichomanophylla A.K.Monro
- Pilea trichosanthes Wedd.
- Pilea trichotoma Liebm.
- Pilea tridentata Killip
- Pilea trilobata (Savigny) Wedd.
- Pilea tripartita A.K.Monro
- Pilea triradiata Killip
- Pilea troyensis Fawc. & Rendle
- Pilea truncata Urb.
- Pilea tsaratananensis Leandri
- Pilea tsiangiana F.P.Metcalf
- Pilea tungurahuae Killip
- Pilea tutensis A.K.Monro
- Pilea ulei Killip
- Pilea umbellata (Bory) Wedd.
- Pilea umbriana Killip
- Pilea umbrosa Wedd. ex Blume
- Pilea unciformis C.J.Chen
- Pilea uninervis Griseb.
- Pilea urticella Wedd.
- Pilea urticifolia (L.f.) Blume
- Pilea usambarensis Engl.
- Pilea valenzuelae Urb.
- Pilea variegata Seem.
- Pilea vegasana Killip
- Pilea venulosa Blume
- Pilea verbascifolia (Savigny) Wedd.
- Pilea vermicularis Majure, Skean & Judd
- Pilea verrucosa Killip
- Pilea versteegii H.J.P.Winkl.
- Pilea victoriae V.Suresh & Sojan
- Pilea victoriensis P.Royen
- Pilea villicaulis Hand.-Mazz.
- Pilea virgata Wedd.
- Pilea vulcanica Liebm.
- Pilea weberbaueri Killip
- Pilea weddellii Fawc. & Rendle
- Pilea weimingii Huan C.Wang
- Pilea wightii Wedd.
- Pilea wilsonii Urb.
- Pilea wollastonii A.K.Monro
- Pilea wrightiana Wedd.
- Pilea wullschlaegelii Urb.
- Pilea yarensis Britton & P.Wilson
- Pilea yingshaoyaoana S.S.Ying
- Pilea yuanbaoshanica W.T.Wang
- Pilea yunckeri C.D.Adams
- Pilea yunquensis (Urb.) Britton & P.Wilson
- Pilea zaranensis P.Royen
