= Clearweed =

Clearweed is a common name for several plants and may refer to:

- Pilea fontana
- Pilea pumila, native to Asia and eastern North America
