= Artillery plant =

Artillery plant is a common name for several plants in the genus Pilea and may refer to:

- Pilea microphylla
- Pilea trianthemoides, native to Florida and the Caribbean
- Lamium galeobdolon
