= Creeping charlie =

Creeping charlie is a common name for several species of flowering plants:

- Glechoma hederacea, also known as "ground ivy", in the family Lamiaceae
- Pilea nummulariifolia, in the family Urticaceae
- Plectranthus verticillatus, in the family Lamiaceae
