= Moon Valley =

Moon Valley may refer to:

== Places ==
- Moon Valley, Phoenix, a neighborhood in Phoenix, Arizona, United States
- Moon Valley, Wisconsin, an unincorporated community in Merrimac, Wisconsin, United States
- Valle de la Luna (Chile), a valley in Atacama desert

== Other uses ==
- Pilea 'Moon Valley', a cultivar of the ornamental plant Pilea mollis
- Moon Valley High School, a high school in Phoenix, Arizona, United States

== See also ==
- List of valleys on the Moon
- Meon Valley (disambiguation)
- Valley of the Moon (disambiguation)
