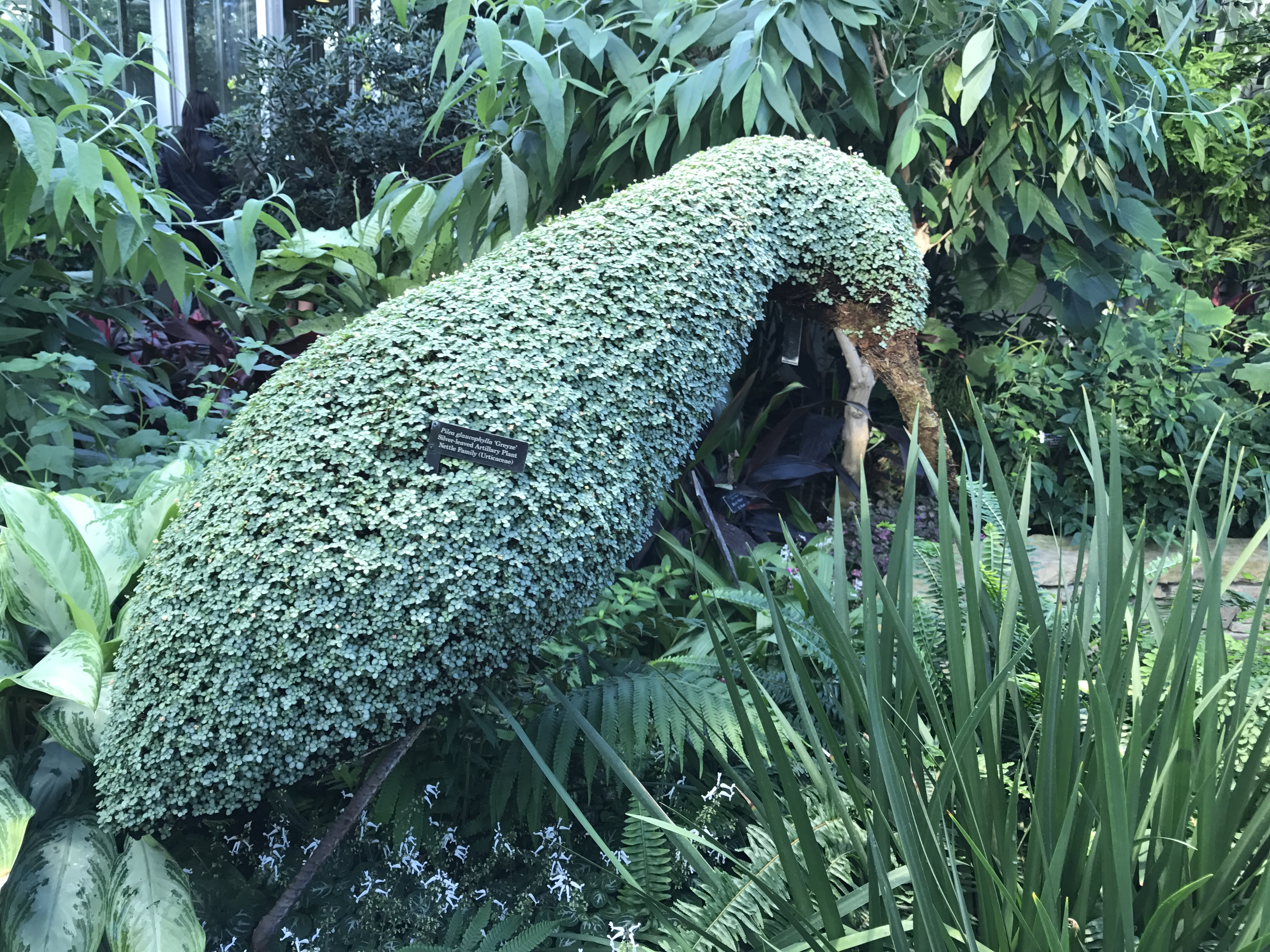

Scientific classification
- Kingdom: Plantae
- Clade: Tracheophytes
- Clade: Angiosperms
- Clade: Eudicots
- Clade: Rosids
- Order: Rosales
- Family: Urticaceae
- Genus: Pilea
- Species: P. glaucophylla

Binomial name
- Pilea glaucophylla Killip

= Pilea glaucophylla =

Species of flowering plant

Pilea glaucophylla, the silver-leaved artillery plant, is a species of flowering plant in the family Urticaceae, native to Colombia.
