= Valley of the Moon =

Valley of the Moon may refer to:

- Crestline, California, has a small neighborhood near Lake Gregory in the San Bernardino Mountains called Valley of the Moon
- Sonoma Valley, California, often called The Valley of the Moon
- Wadi Rum, also known as The Valley of the Moon, a valley in Jordan
- Ischigualasto Provincial Park, Argentina, also called Valley of the Moon
- Valley of the Moon (Tucson, Arizona), children's fantasy park listed on the National Register of Historic Places listings in Pima County, Arizona
- The Valley of the Moon (novel), 1913 novel written by Jack London
- Valley of the Moon (1914 film), a 1914 silent film
- Valley of the Moon (album) by the band Lovecraft, see H.P. Lovecraft (band)
- Valley of the Moon, a short film featuring Dylan Riley Snyder

== See also ==
- Moon Valley (disambiguation)
- Valle de la Luna (disambiguation)
- Valley of the Moon Commute Club, a former bus service in the San Francisco Bay Area
