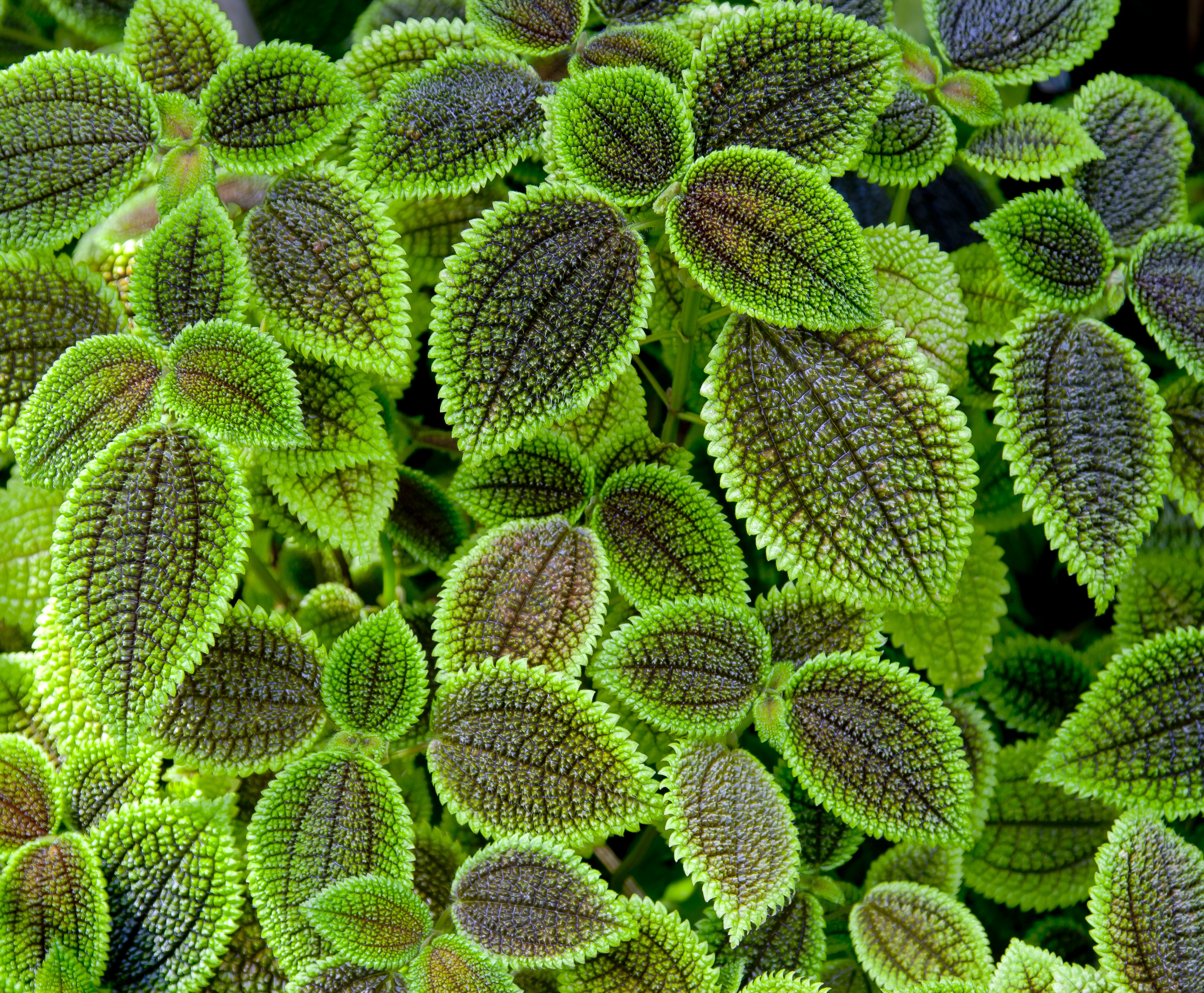

Scientific classification
- Kingdom: Plantae
- Clade: Tracheophytes
- Clade: Angiosperms
- Clade: Eudicots
- Clade: Rosids
- Order: Rosales
- Family: Urticaceae
- Genus: Pilea
- Species: P. involucrata

Binomial name
- Pilea involucrata (Sims) Urb.

= Pilea involucrata =

Friendship plant

Species of flowering plant

Pilea involucrata (Sims) Urb., commonly known as the friendship plant, is a species of flowering plant in the nettle family Urticaceae, native to Central and South America. It is a popular houseplant due to its unique foliage and relatively easy care. This species is best known for its popular cultivar, Pilea involucrata 'Moon Valley'.

== Description ==
Pilea involucrata is a bushy, trailing plant typically growing to a height and spread of 10–12 inches (25–30 centimetres). The species typically features bright green leaves with a quilted or corrugated texture, often with bronze or reddish undersides. It occasionally produces small, pink-white flowers, but these are infrequent when grown indoors.

== Cultivation ==
The friendship plant prefers bright, indirect light and well-draining soil that is kept evenly moist. It thrives in temperatures between 65–80 °F (18–27 °C) and moderate to high humidity levels. Pilea involucrata is easily propagated through division or stem cuttings.

== Cultivar: 'Moon Valley' ==
Pilea involucrata 'Moon Valley', also known as the Moon Valley plant, is a distinct cultivar recognized for its deeply textured, cratered leaves that resemble the moon's surface. The foliage is primarily chartreuse-green, highlighted by prominent bronze-colored veins. It is often mistakenly identified as Pilea mollis due to its similar appearance and the shared common name "friendship plant".

== Uses ==
Pilea involucrata, including its 'Moon Valley' cultivar, is primarily grown as a houseplant. It is well-suited for terrariums, hanging baskets, and tabletop displays due to its compact size and visually appealing foliage.
