= Meon Valley =

Meon Valley may refer to:

- The valley of the River Meon, Hampshire, England
- Meon Valley (UK Parliament constituency), former constituency represented in the House of Commons of the United Kingdom's Parliament
- Meon Valley Railway, cross-country railway in Hampshire, England
- Meon Valley Trail (footpath), recreational footpath in Hampshire, England

== See also ==
- Moon Valley (disambiguation)
