= Pilea daguensis =

Scientific classification
- Kingdom: Plantae
- Clade: Tracheophytes
- Clade: Angiosperms
- Clade: Eudicots
- Clade: Rosids
- Order: Rosales
- Family: Urticaceae
- Genus: Pilea
- Species: P. daguensis

Binomial name
- Pilea daguensis Killip

Species of plant

Pilea daguensis is a plant in the family Urticaceae. Its native range is limited to Mexico.
