= Valle de la Luna =

Valle de la Luna is Spanish for Valley of the Moon and it may refer to:

- Valle de la Luna (Argentina)
- Valle de la Luna (Bolivia) in the La Paz Department, Bolivia
- Valle de la Luna, Potosí, Bolivia (also called "El Sillar") in the Potosí Department, Bolivia
- Valle de la Luna (Chile)

== See also ==
- Valley of the Moon (disambiguation)
