= Pilea schimpfii =

Conservation status
- Vulnerable (IUCN 3.1)

Scientific classification
- Kingdom: Plantae
- Clade: Tracheophytes
- Clade: Angiosperms
- Clade: Eudicots
- Clade: Rosids
- Order: Rosales
- Family: Urticaceae
- Genus: Pilea
- Species: P. schimpfii

Binomial name
- Pilea schimpfii Diels

Species of flowering plant

Pilea schimpfii is a species of plant in the family Urticaceae. It is endemic to the Chimborazo, Napo, El Oro, and Carchi provinces of Ecuador. Its natural habitats are subtropical or tropical moist lowland forests and subtropical or tropical moist montane forests. During the second world war, the only plants in captivity were destroyed in the German herbarium in Berlin, Germany.
