= Pilea fairchildiana =

Scientific classification
- Kingdom: Plantae
- Clade: Tracheophytes
- Clade: Angiosperms
- Clade: Eudicots
- Clade: Rosids
- Order: Rosales
- Family: Urticaceae
- Genus: Pilea
- Species: P. fairchildiana

Binomial name
- Pilea fairchildiana Jestrow & Jiménez Rodr.

Species of flowering plant

Pilea fairchildiana, previously known as Sarcopilea domingensis, is a succulent plant in the family Urticaceae. It is endemic to the Constanza Mountains of the Dominican Republic. It was thought to be under a monospecific genus (Sarcopilea), but with new phylogenetic information is now placed under the genus Pilea.

== Description ==
Pilea fairchildiana has the growth habit of a succulent shrub and can grow up to 12 inches tall. The leaves are long and tapered, growing up to 6 inches in length. They are thick and fleshy, having scarce venation due to being filled with water to survive in arid climates or soil conditions. The succulent leaves are alternately arranged in rosettes located on the tips of the stems. They have a dioecious reproductive system with tiny, pink, ball-like clustered flowers. The plant has a complex inflorescence with radially symmetrical flowers. Additionally, they are not CAM plants and have two unique features unusual for terrestrial plants: water stored in specialized tissue beneath the photosynthetic layer and leaf stomata located on the upper surface of the leaves.

== Ecology ==
This succulent plant is usually found at elevations between 500 and 1,500 meters around well-drained cliffs above streams. The plant's biome is a tropical coniferous forest in the bioregion of the Caribbean and the island of Hispaniola. Its habitat is a Hispaniolan pine forest that is surrounded by lower elevations of Hispaniolan moist and dry forests. The soil that is in the pine forest is lateritic soils and can be found in limestone bedrock as well. P. fairchildiana is both dispersed and pollinated by the wind as that is very common for dioecious plants and because the flowers are not showy.

== Cultivation and uses ==
Pilea fairchildiana can be easily cultivated in a tropical climate with regular potting soil or highly basic pH soils containing limestone. Currently, the plant is being cultivated at Fairchild Botanical Gardens in Coral Gables, Florida, where it can be grown for ornamental and conservation purposes. The garden only has a single male plant but, male and female cuttings have been collected during a plant exploration trip to the Dominican Republic in partnership with Montgomery Botanical Center. They are now growing and may be able to start producing seeds for propagation and plant distribution in the upcoming years. As of now, the conservation status for this species is that it is endangered.
