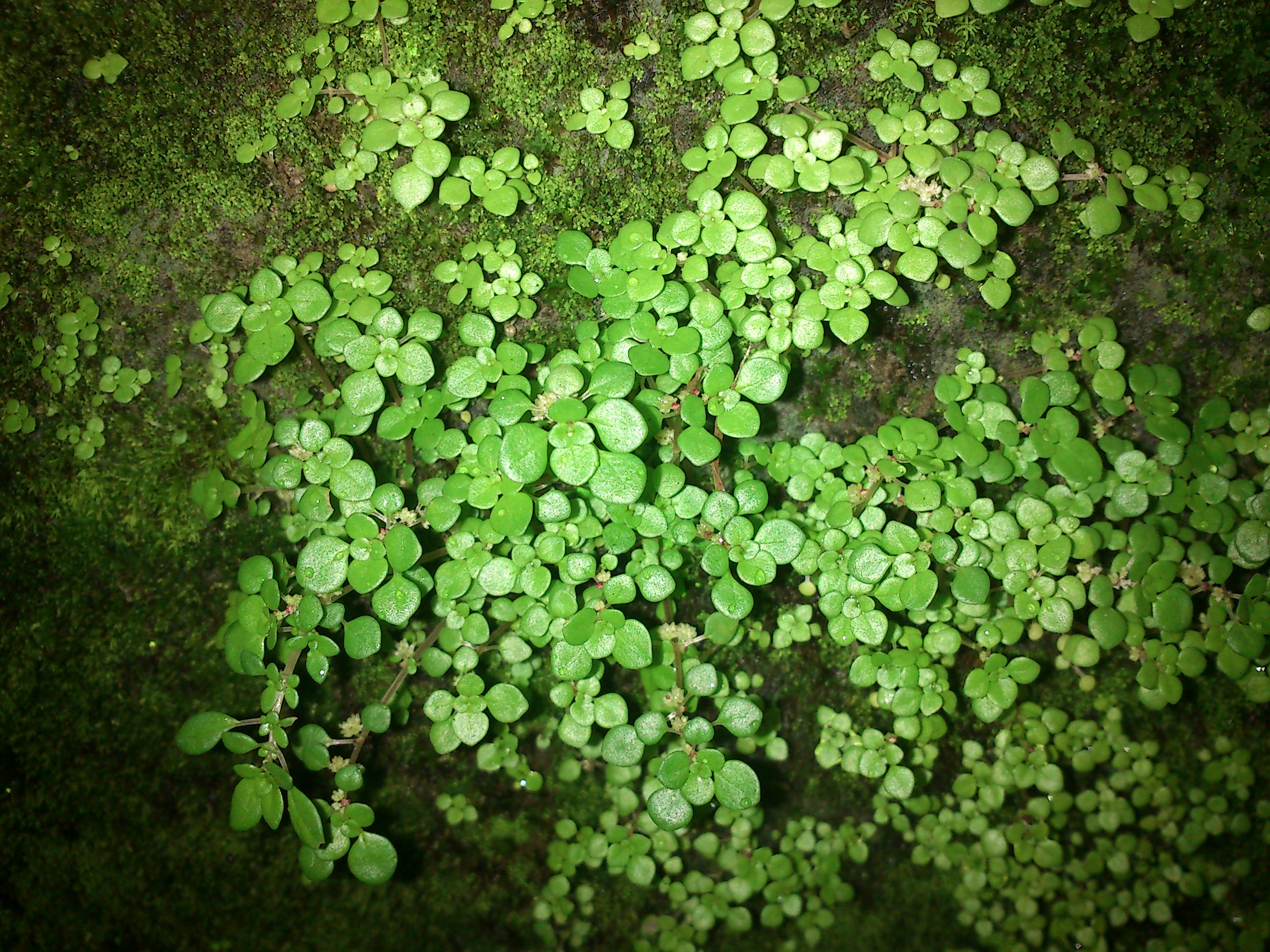

Scientific classification
- Kingdom: Plantae
- Clade: Tracheophytes
- Clade: Angiosperms
- Clade: Eudicots
- Clade: Rosids
- Order: Rosales
- Family: Urticaceae
- Genus: Pilea
- Species: P. victoriae

Binomial name
- Pilea victoriae V. Suresh & Sojan, 2017

= Pilea victoriae =

Species of flowering plant

Pilea victoriae is a plant species discovered by a team of botanists from the Government Victoria College, Palakkad, Kerala. The species is named after its type location Government Victoria College, Palakkad in honor of its services to the education sector of the state. It is distinguished from the similar P. microphylla by its erect stem and its branching from the base. P. victoriae grows to about 10 centimetres (3.9 in) high, both on other plants and on rocks.
