= Pilea repens =

Scientific classification
- Kingdom: Plantae
- Clade: Tracheophytes
- Clade: Angiosperms
- Clade: Eudicots
- Clade: Rosids
- Order: Rosales
- Family: Urticaceae
- Genus: Pilea
- Species: P. repens

Binomial name
- Pilea repens (Sw.) Wedd.

Species of flowering plant

Pilea repens is a plant which is sometimes cultivated, especially where high humidity can be provided, such as in a terrarium. It is native to the West Indies and has dark-colored leaves.
