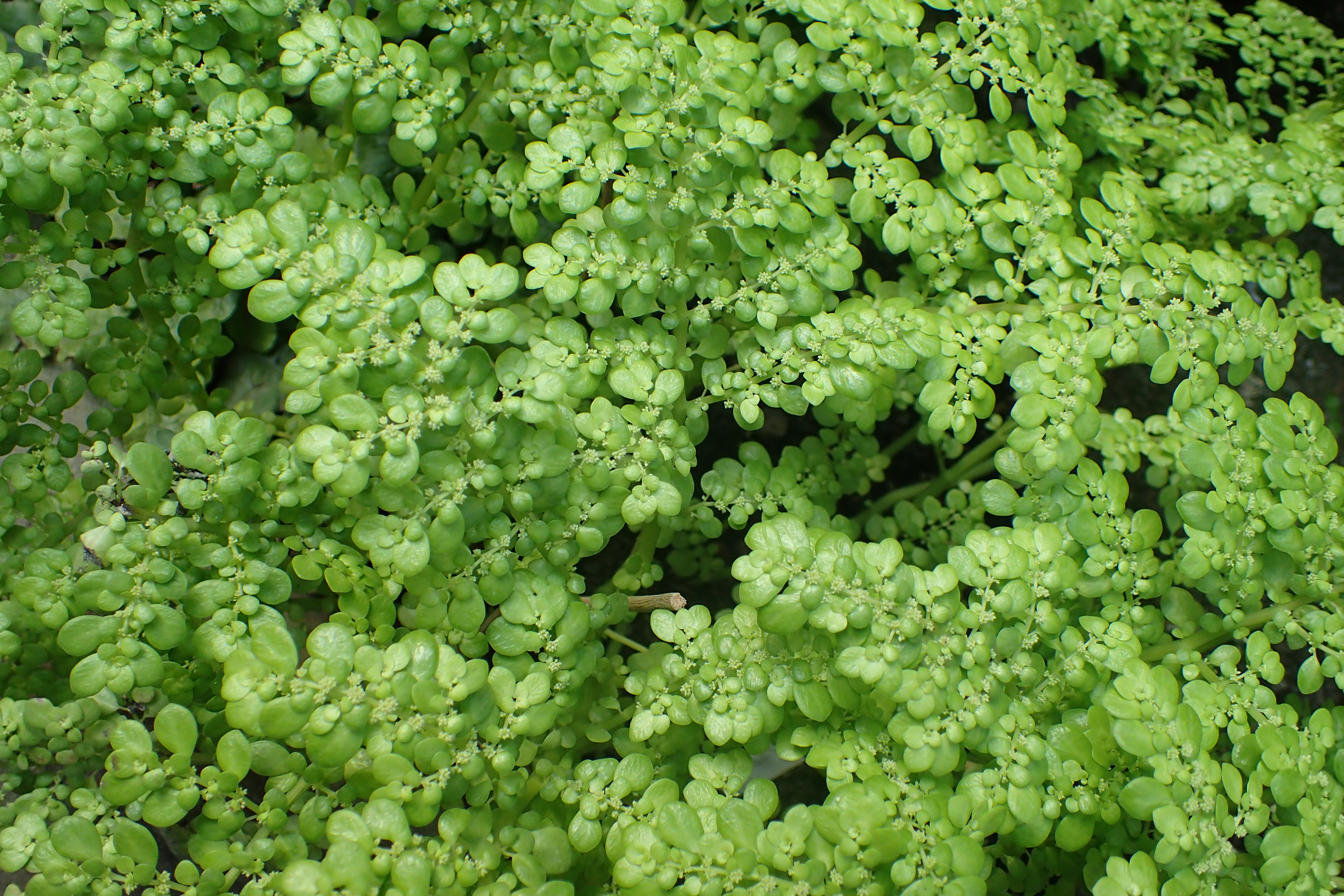

Scientific classification
- Kingdom: Plantae
- Clade: Tracheophytes
- Clade: Angiosperms
- Clade: Eudicots
- Clade: Rosids
- Order: Rosales
- Family: Urticaceae
- Genus: Pilea
- Species: P. serpyllifolia

Binomial name
- Pilea serpyllifolia (Poir.) Wedd.

Synonyms
- Adicea serpyllifolia (Poir.) Kuntze; Dubrueilia serpyllifolia (Poir.) Gaudich.; Parietaria serpyllifolia Poir.; Adicea franquevilleana (Wedd.) Kuntze; Pilea franquevilleana Wedd.; Pilea peplidifolia Schltdl.

= Pilea serpyllifolia =

Species of flowering plant

Pilea serpyllifolia is a species of plant in the nettle family Urticaceae. It is native to Hispaniola.
