= Pilea trilobata =

Scientific classification
- Kingdom: Plantae
- Clade: Tracheophytes
- Clade: Angiosperms
- Clade: Eudicots
- Clade: Rosids
- Order: Rosales
- Family: Urticaceae
- Genus: Pilea
- Species: P. trilobata

Binomial name
- Pilea trilobata (Wedd.)

Synonyms
- Urtica trilobata Poiret

Species of flowering plant

Pilea trilobata is an endemic Mauritian plant from the genus Pilea within the family Urticaceae. It was first described by botanist Hugh Algernon Weddell in 1854. It was thought to be extinct since 1849 until it was rediscovered in April 2005 in the Corps de Garde Nature Reserve.
