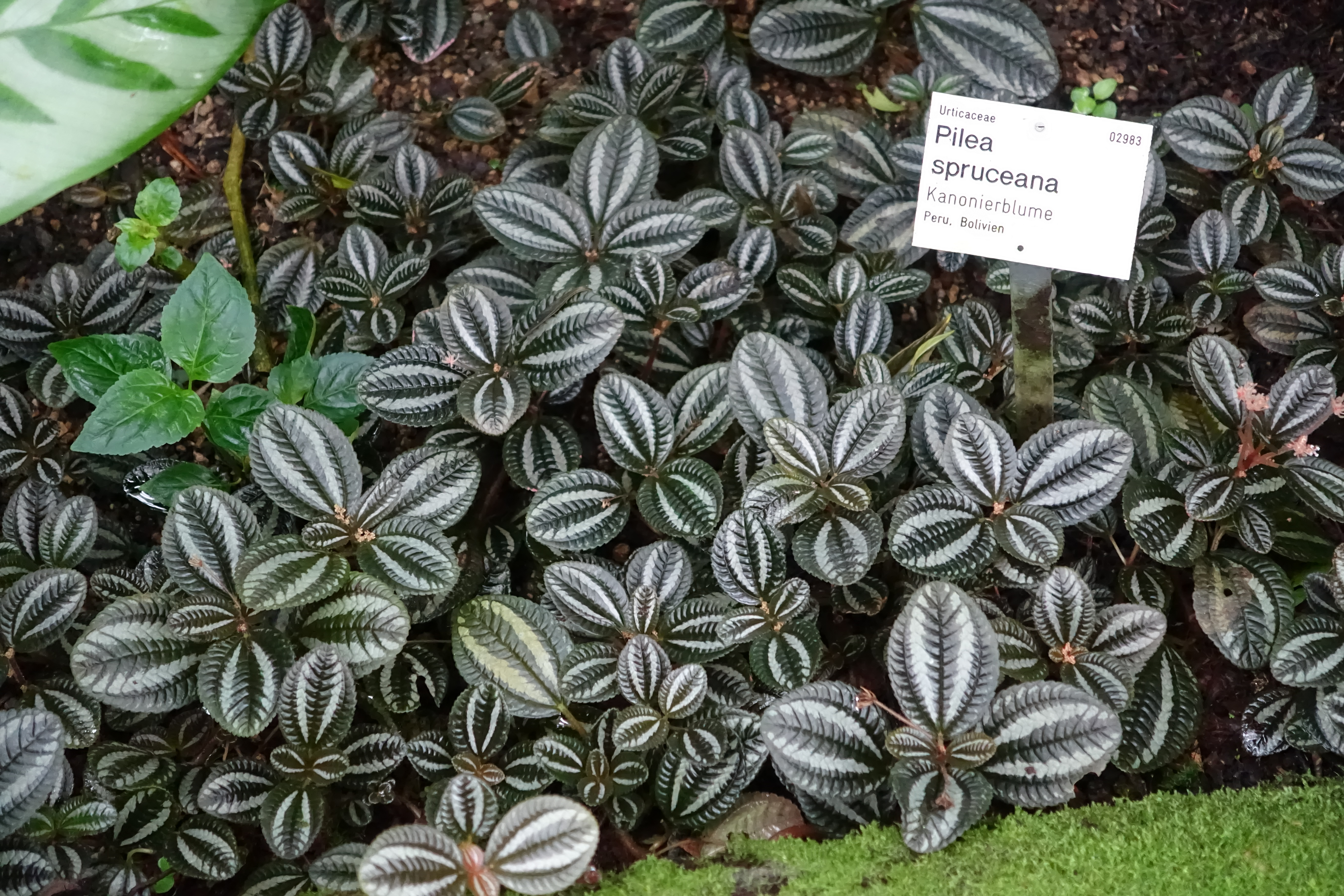

Scientific classification
- Kingdom: Plantae
- Clade: Tracheophytes
- Clade: Angiosperms
- Clade: Eudicots
- Clade: Rosids
- Order: Rosales
- Family: Urticaceae
- Genus: Pilea
- Species: P. spruceana

Binomial name
- Pilea spruceana Wedd.

= Pilea spruceana =

Species of tree

Pilea spruceana (silver tree) is a species of evergreen plant in the family Urticaceae, which grows up to 1 foot in height, with a spread of up to 1.5 feet.

== Synonyms ==
- Adicea spruceana (Wedd.) Kuntze
