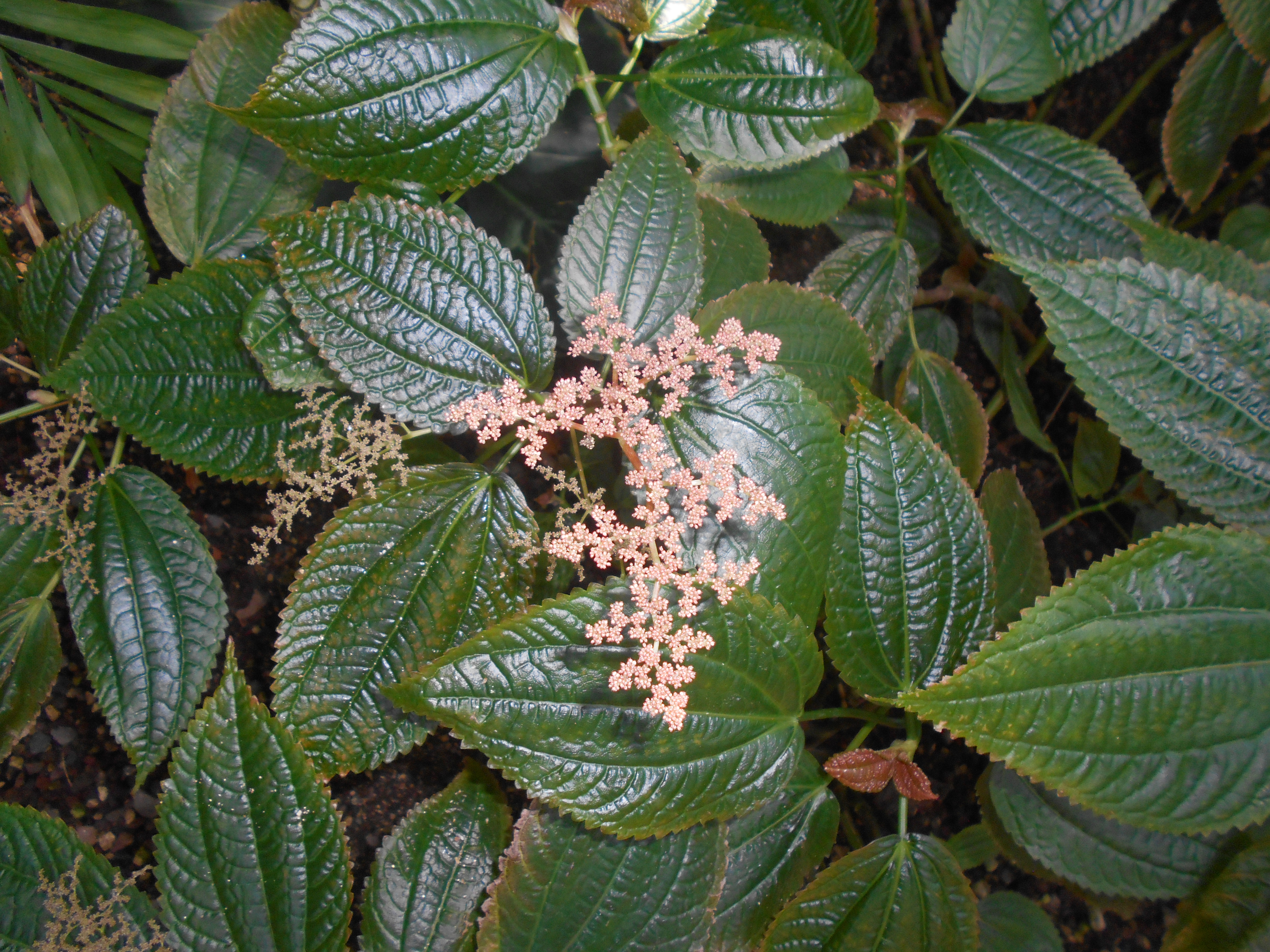

Scientific classification
- Kingdom: Plantae
- Clade: Tracheophytes
- Clade: Angiosperms
- Clade: Eudicots
- Clade: Rosids
- Order: Rosales
- Family: Urticaceae
- Genus: Pilea
- Species: P. grandifolia

Binomial name
- Pilea grandifolia (L.) Blume

= Pilea grandifolia =

Species of shrub

Pilea grandifolia is an undershrub native only to Jamaica. It is sometimes cultivated.
