= Pilea fontana =

Scientific classification
- Kingdom: Plantae
- Clade: Tracheophytes
- Clade: Angiosperms
- Clade: Eudicots
- Clade: Rosids
- Order: Rosales
- Family: Urticaceae
- Genus: Pilea
- Species: P. fontana

Binomial name
- Pilea fontana (Lunell) Rydb.

Species of flowering plant

Pilea fontana, the lesser clearweed, is an herbaceous plant which is very similar to Pilea pumila (both occupying an almost identical range covering most of North America east of the Rocky Mountains). They can be distinguished by the appearance of the mature achenes. The bloom season runs from July to September and the plant can be seen throughout the Northeastern US and Canada. The fruit is a flattened, teardrop-shaped up to 1/6 inch long and 75-85% as wide.
