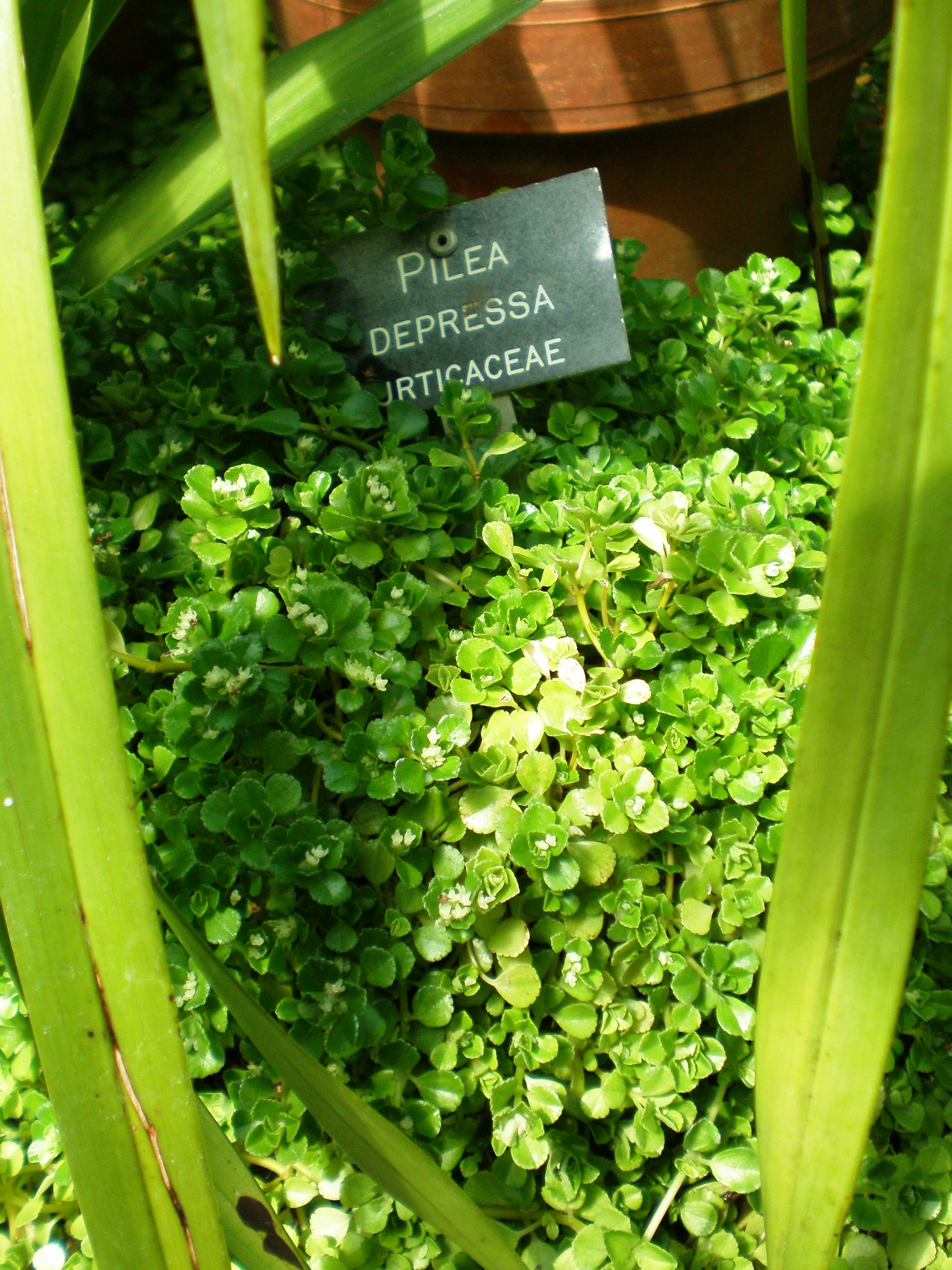

Scientific classification
- Kingdom: Plantae
- Clade: Tracheophytes
- Clade: Angiosperms
- Clade: Eudicots
- Clade: Rosids
- Order: Rosales
- Family: Urticaceae
- Genus: Pilea
- Species: P. depressa

Binomial name
- Pilea depressa (Sw.) Blume

= Pilea depressa =

Species of flowering plant

Pilea depressa, the depressed clearweed, also sold as kiereweed, is a plant native to the Caribbean.
