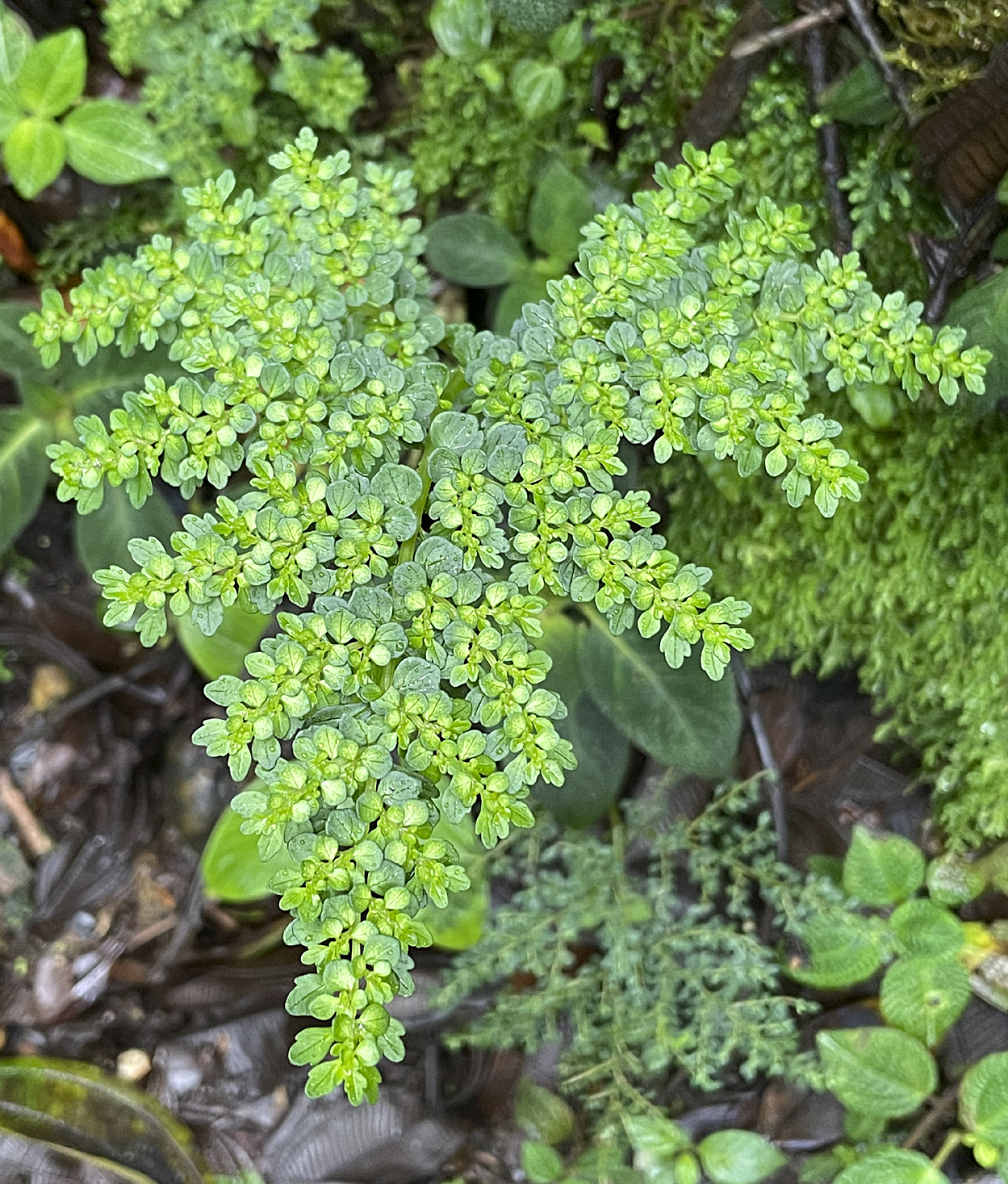

Conservation status
- Vulnerable (IUCN 3.1)

Scientific classification
- Kingdom: Plantae
- Clade: Tracheophytes
- Clade: Angiosperms
- Clade: Eudicots
- Clade: Rosids
- Order: Rosales
- Family: Urticaceae
- Genus: Pilea
- Species: P. myriophylla

Binomial name
- Pilea myriophylla Killip

= Pilea myriophylla =

Species of flowering plant

Pilea myriophylla is a species of plant in the family Urticaceae. It is endemic to Ecuador. Its natural habitats are subtropical or tropical dry shrubland and subtropical or tropical high-altitude grassland.
