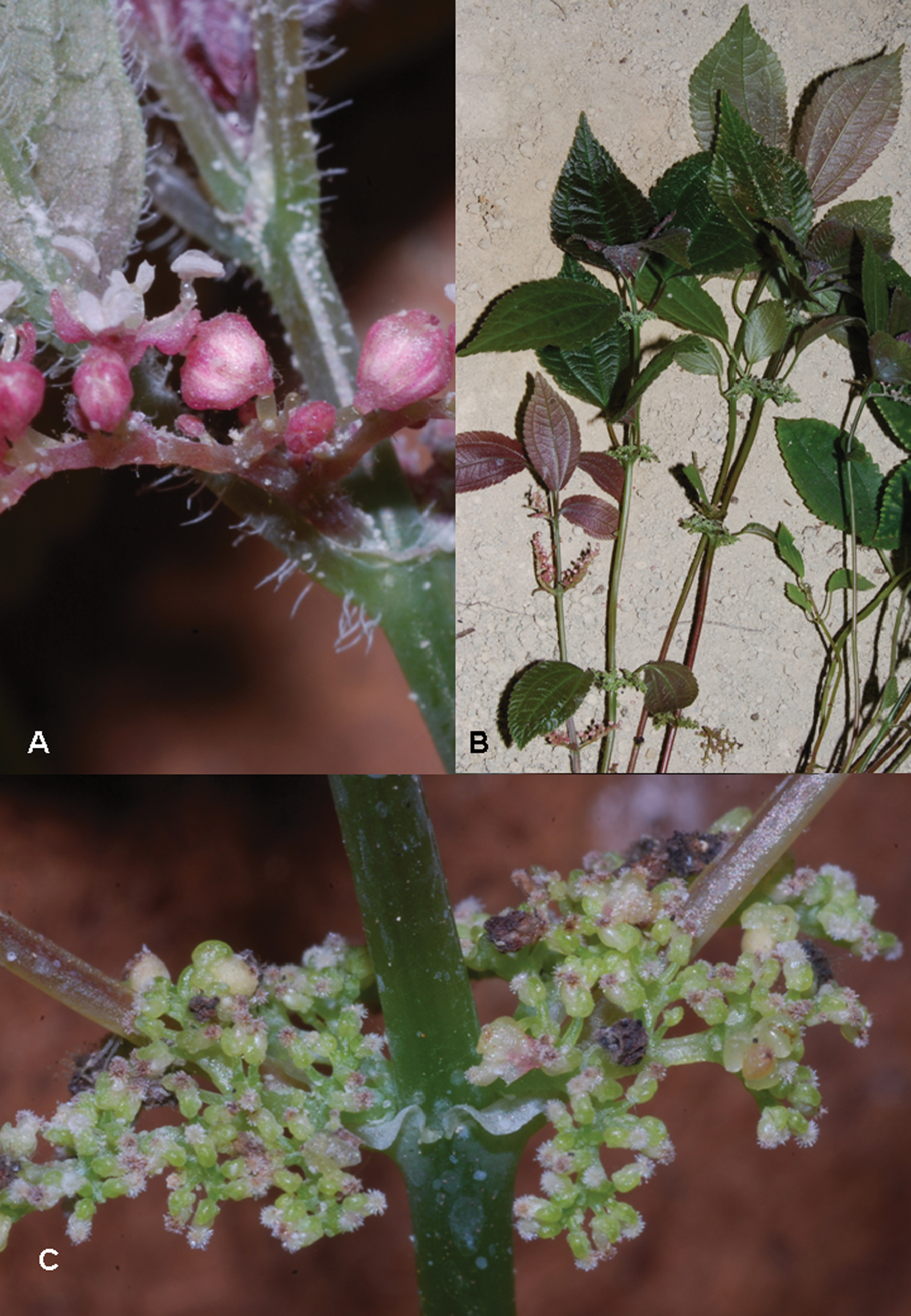
- A Staminate flowers B Habit with cave floor C Pistillate inflorescence and flowers

Scientific classification
- Kingdom: Plantae
- Clade: Tracheophytes
- Clade: Angiosperms
- Clade: Eudicots
- Clade: Rosids
- Order: Rosales
- Family: Urticaceae
- Genus: Pilea
- Species: P. cavernicola

Binomial name
- Pilea cavernicola Monro, Wei and Chen

= Pilea cavernicola =

Species of flowering plant

Pilea cavernicola is a herbaceous plant about 0.5 meters tall, native to China. A sciophyte, it grows in very low light conditions in caves in Fengshan County, Guangxi, China.
