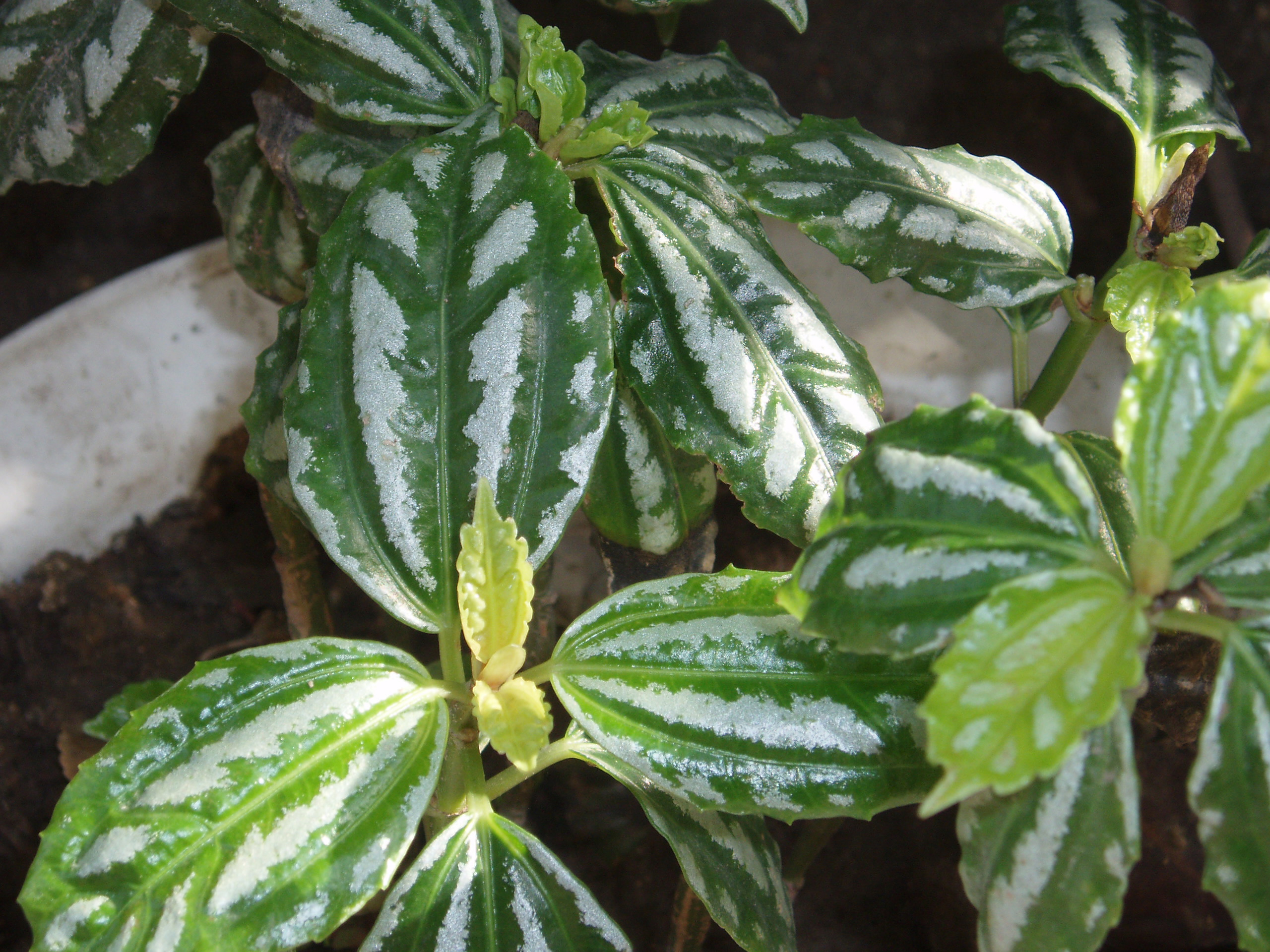

Scientific classification
- Kingdom: Plantae
- Clade: Tracheophytes
- Clade: Angiosperms
- Clade: Eudicots
- Clade: Rosids
- Order: Rosales
- Family: Urticaceae
- Genus: Pilea
- Species: P. cadierei

Binomial name
- Pilea cadierei Gagnep. & Guillaumin

= Pilea cadierei =

Species of flowering plant

Pilea cadierei (or the aluminium plant or watermelon pilea) is a species of flowering plant in the nettle family, Urticaceae. The species is endemic to the southern Chinese provinces of Guizhou and Yunnan, as well as Vietnam. The specific epithet cadierei refers to the 20th-century botanist R.P. Cadière. P. cadierei has earned the Royal Horticultural Society's Award of Garden Merit for its hardiness and reliability as a houseplant. In warmer countries, usually within USDA zones 8–12, the plant may be grown outside year-round as a perennial, either in-ground or contained, and pruned about 50% during the autumn (or whenever blooming concludes).

== Description ==
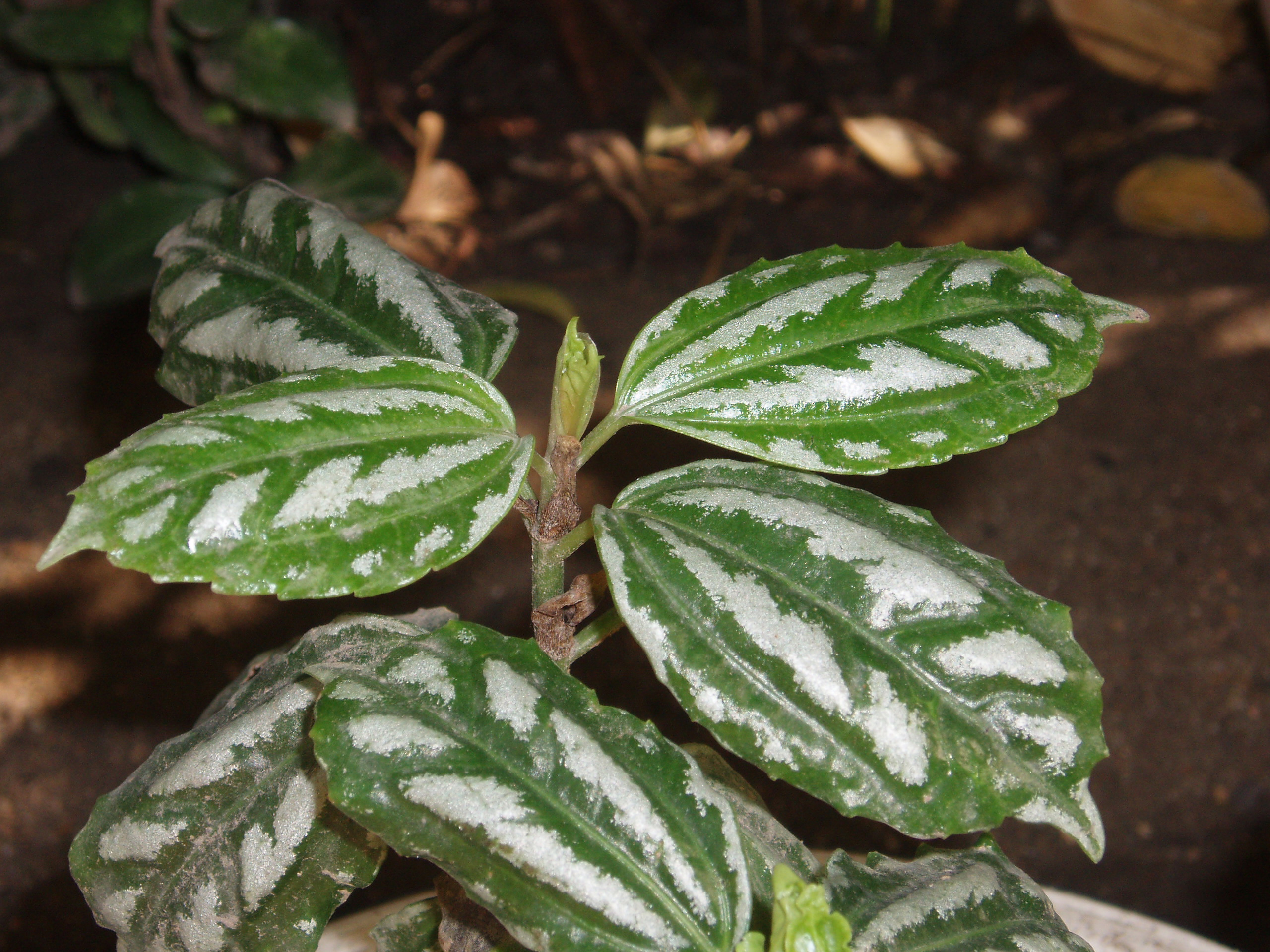
The opposite, stalked leaves with three main nerves

The aluminum pilea is an evergreen perennial, growing up to 60 cm (24 in) tall and featuring dark-green, oval leaves, with slightly “textured” or “serrated” edges, and with each leaf having four raised silvery patches (hence the name "aluminium plant"). The plant forms subterranean rhizomes to colonize an area. The independent and upright stems are somewhat succulent and may grow woody over time at the base. The stems are mostly featureless, though (along with the stipules, petioles and blades) they have a fine coating of spindle-shaped cystoliths.

The constantly opposing arrangement of the stems and leaves are divided into petiole and leaf blade. The bald petioles are all almost the same length, usually in the range of 7 to 15 millimeters. The simple, dark-green, parchment-like, almost uniformly shaped leaf blades are obovate, with a length of 2.5 to 6 centimeters and a width of 1.5 to 3 centimeters. They have a broad, wedge-shaped or almost rounded blade base and a spiky tip.

There are three main nerves that are visible along at least 3/4 of their length and there are three side nerves on each side. The leaf margins are hardly recognizable to weakly serrated or bitten out. On the upper side of the leaf there are two subdivided white furrows and this results in some silvery raised areas (hence the English designations "aluminum" or "watermelon plant"). The early falling, parchment-like stipules are initially green and brown when dry, and are 10 to 13 millimeters long and elongated with two ribs.

=== Inflorescence and fruit ===
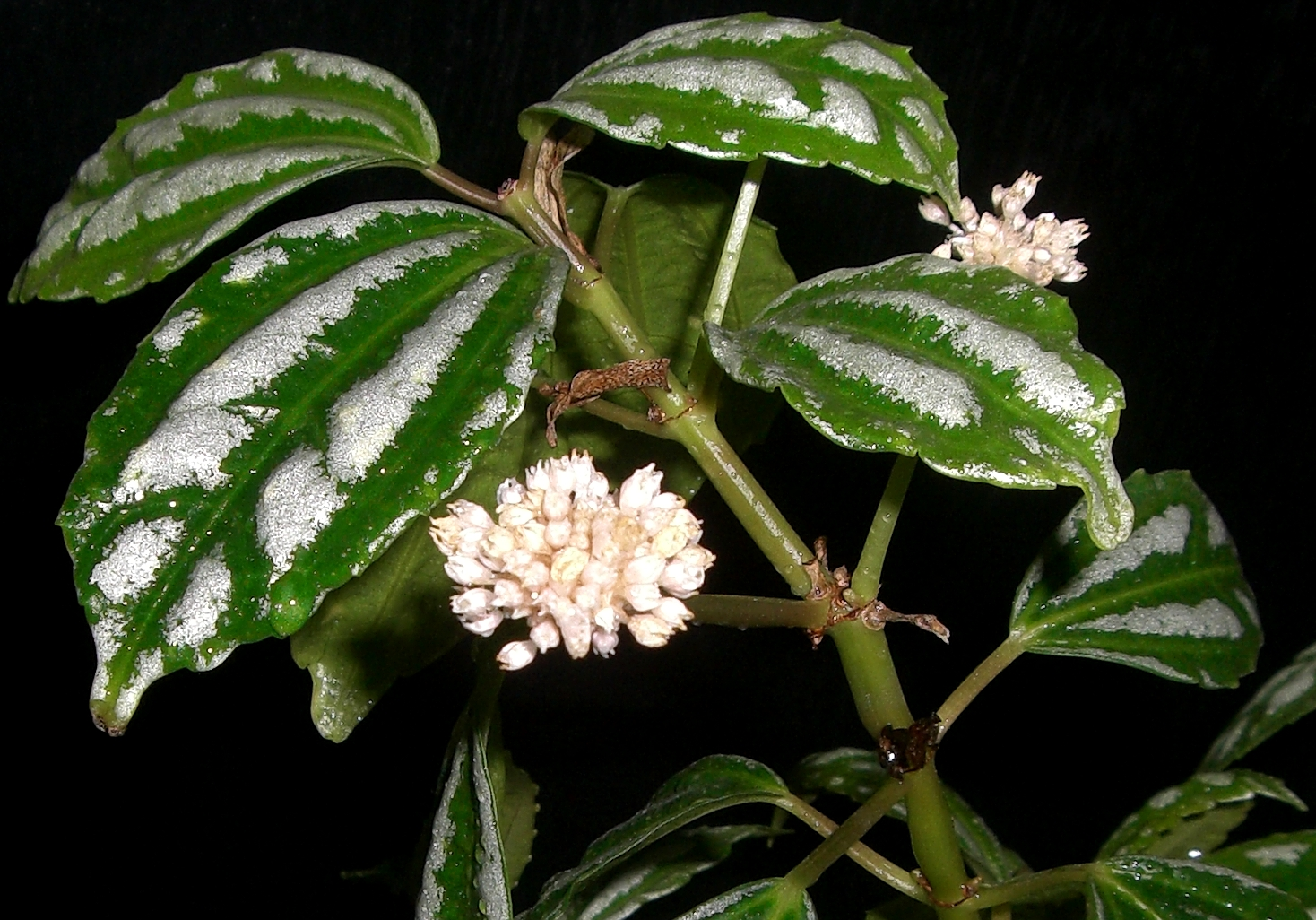
A pair of inflorescences

The flowering period in China ranges from September to November. Pilea cadierei is monoecious. The male inflorescence is compact and heady and contains 5 to 125 flowers on 1.5-to-4-centimetre-long (0.59 to 1.57 in) inflorescence stems. The bracts are broadly ovoid with a length of about 3 millimeters. The flower stems of the male flowers are 2 to 3 millimeters long and the flower buds are pear-shaped with a length of about 2.5 millimeters. The relatively small, white-pink flowers are fourfold. The male flowers have a length of 2.5 to 3 millimeters and a diameter of 1.8 to 2 millimeters. The four boat-shaped, about 3-millimeter-long bracts on the male flowers grow together up to half their length and are cartilaginous in the upper area. The four stamens protrude beyond the chalice and "explode" when shaken. The female flowers are almost seated in the cymose inflorescences. In the female flowers a rudimentary conical carpel is present in each case. With a length of 0.5 to 0.7 millimeters, the durable bracts of the female flowers are half as long as the nut fruit. In the female flowers there is usually only an upstanding fruit leaf and elongated staminodes. The female flowers have a simple style.

The fruits ripen in China between November and December. The nut fruits are always lonely and are egg-shaped and flattened at a length of about 1.5 millimeters. The seeds contain endosperm and a straight embryo with two oval-elliptical or circular cotyledons.

== Cultivation ==
With a minimum temperature of 15 °C (59 °F), P. cadierei is cultivated as a houseplant in temperate regions due to its decorative leaves and easy vegetative propagation through cuttings. This plant is non-toxic to cats, dogs, and horses, and so is safe to have around pets.
