= Pilea napoana =

Conservation status
- Vulnerable (IUCN 3.1)

Scientific classification
- Kingdom: Plantae
- Clade: Tracheophytes
- Clade: Angiosperms
- Clade: Eudicots
- Clade: Rosids
- Order: Rosales
- Family: Urticaceae
- Genus: Pilea
- Species: P. napoana

Binomial name
- Pilea napoana Gilli

Species of flowering plant

Pilea napoana is a species of plant in the family Urticaceae. It is endemic to Ecuador. Its natural habitat is subtropical or tropical moist montane forests.
