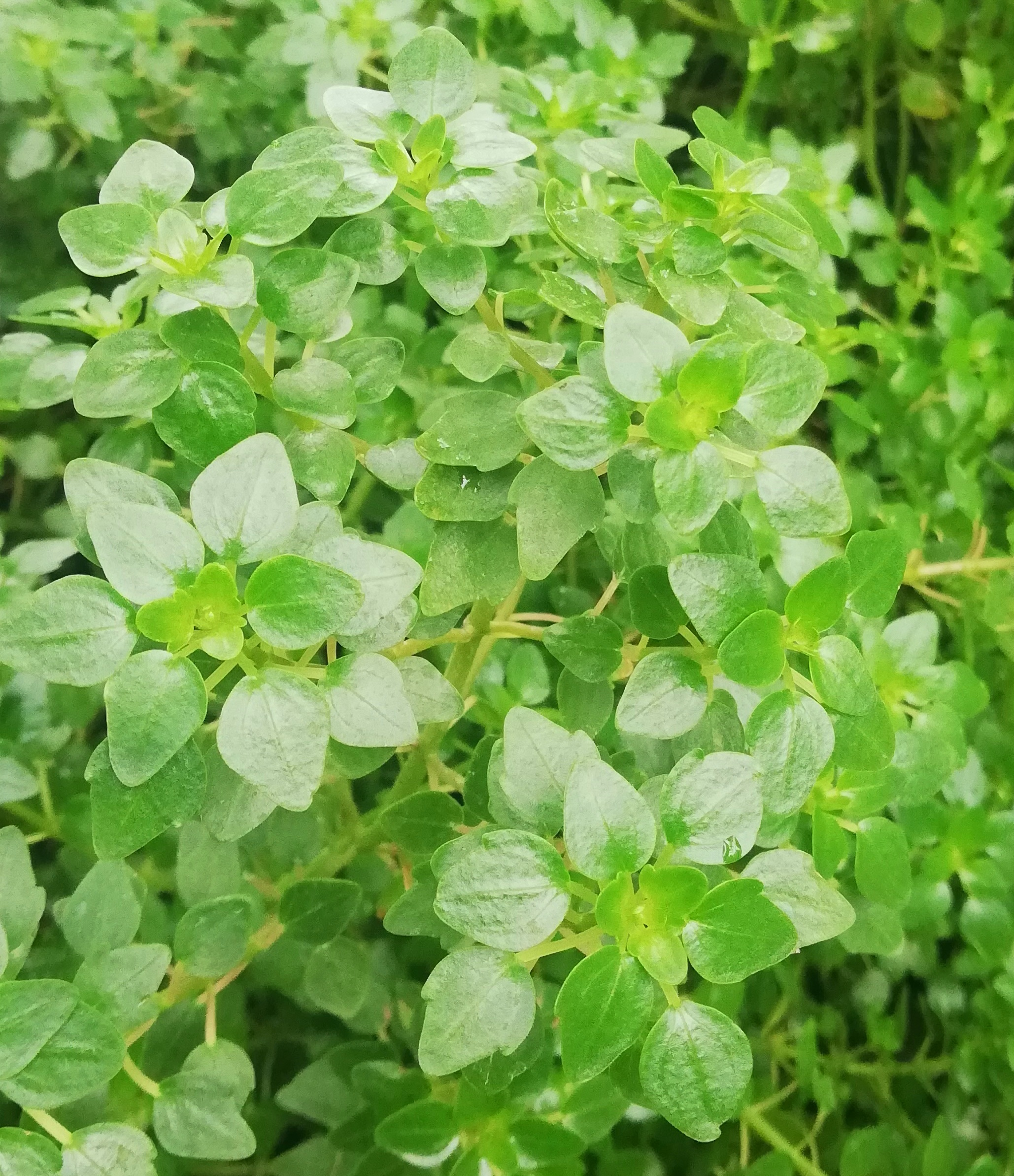
- Pilea laevicaulis

Conservation status
- Critically Endangered (IUCN 2.3)

Scientific classification
- Kingdom: Plantae
- Clade: Tracheophytes
- Clade: Angiosperms
- Clade: Eudicots
- Clade: Rosids
- Order: Rosales
- Family: Urticaceae
- Genus: Pilea
- Species: P. laevicaulis

Binomial name
- Pilea laevicaulis Wedd.

= Pilea laevicaulis =

Species of flowering plant

Pilea laevicaulis is a species of plant in the family Urticaceae. It is endemic to Mauritius. Its natural habitat is subtropical or tropical dry forests.
