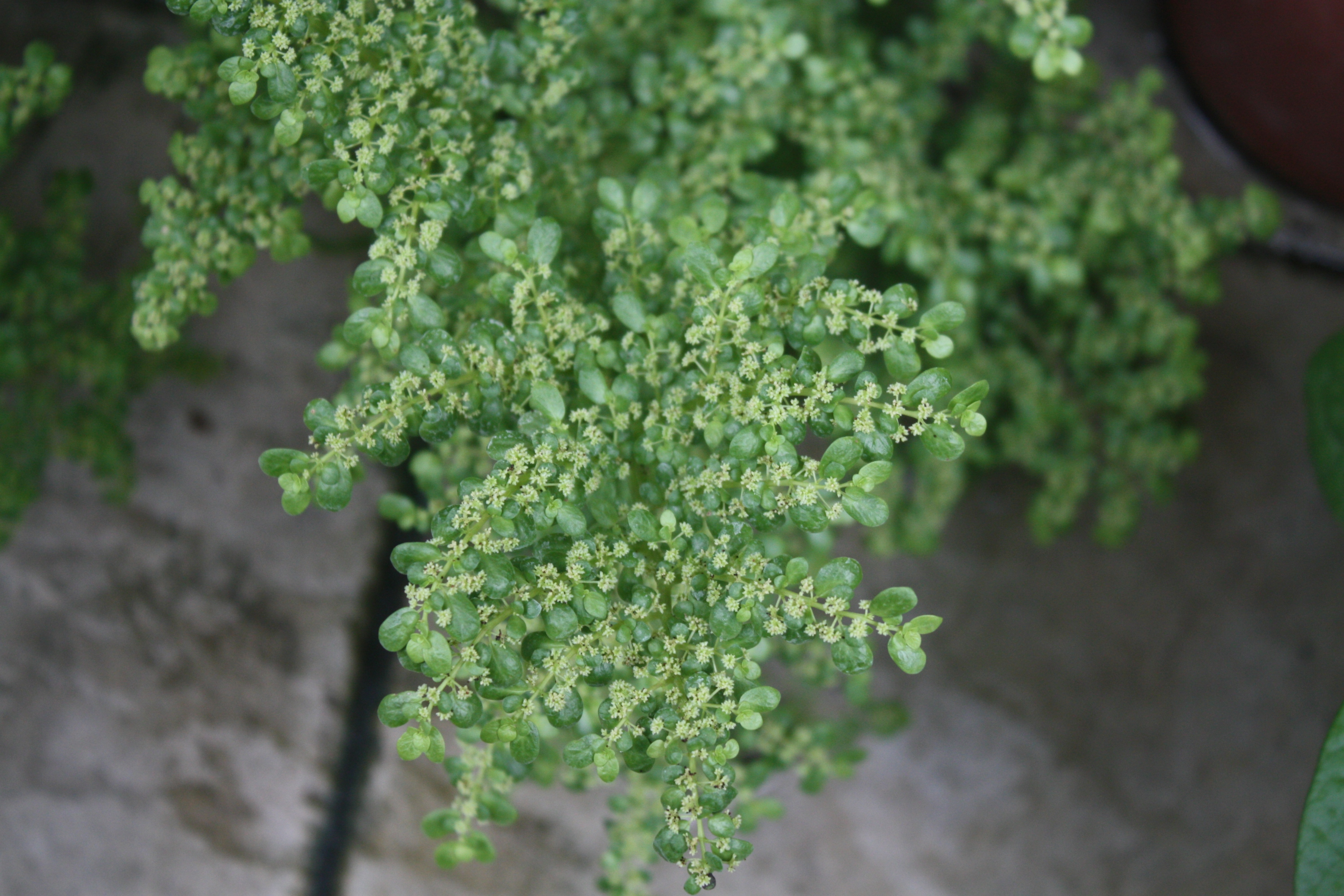
- Pilea serpyllacea in the glass-house of the botanical garden of Tartu University, Estonia

Scientific classification
- Kingdom: Plantae
- Clade: Tracheophytes
- Clade: Angiosperms
- Clade: Eudicots
- Clade: Rosids
- Order: Rosales
- Family: Urticaceae
- Genus: Pilea
- Species: P. serpyllacea

Binomial name
- Pilea serpyllacea (Kunth) Liebm.

= Pilea serpyllacea =

Species of flowering plant

Pilea serpyllacea is an herbaceous plant native to Venezuela, Bolivia, Colombia, Ecuador, and Peru. It has been introduced into a number of areas outside its native range, such as Hawaii and the Galapagos.
