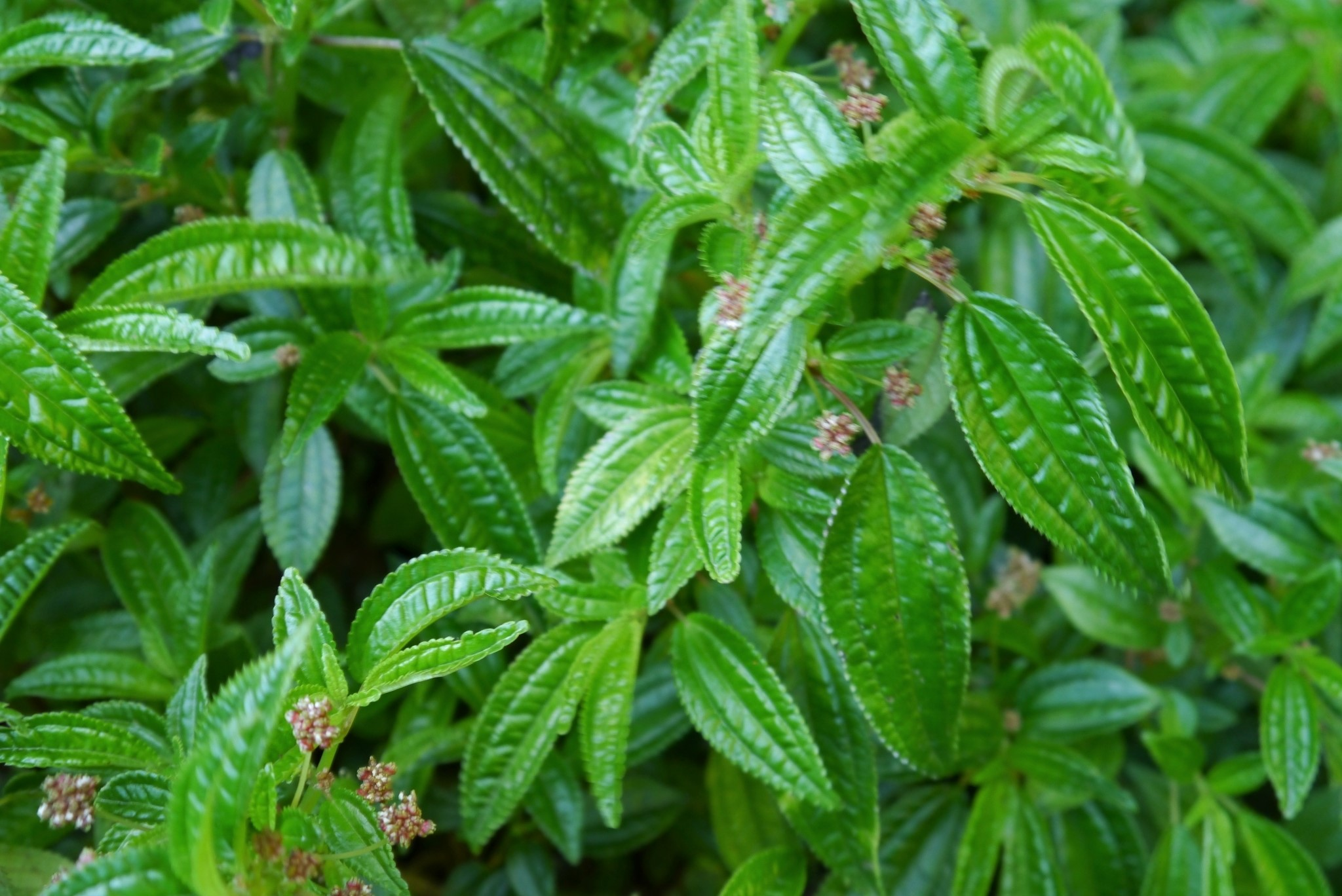

Scientific classification
- Kingdom: Plantae
- Clade: Tracheophytes
- Clade: Angiosperms
- Clade: Eudicots
- Clade: Rosids
- Order: Rosales
- Family: Urticaceae
- Genus: Pilea
- Species: P. elegans

Binomial name
- Pilea elegans Gay

Synonyms
- Adicea elegans (Wedd.) Kuntze, 1891

= Pilea elegans =

Species of flowering plant

Pilea elegans is a species of flowering plant in the family Urticaceae. It is endemic to Chile, inhabiting the Biobio, Araucanía and Los Ríos regions.

USDA hardiness zone 9. The plant does not tolerate snow, but can tolerate occasional freezing spells of about -5 degrees C. Light requirements consist of indirect light/low light (In deep shadow). It can be found in deep ravines in Chile facing south with additional shadow from trees, or where there is a very dense vegetation cover which gives 80 - 100% shadow (for instance, the Valdivian forests).
