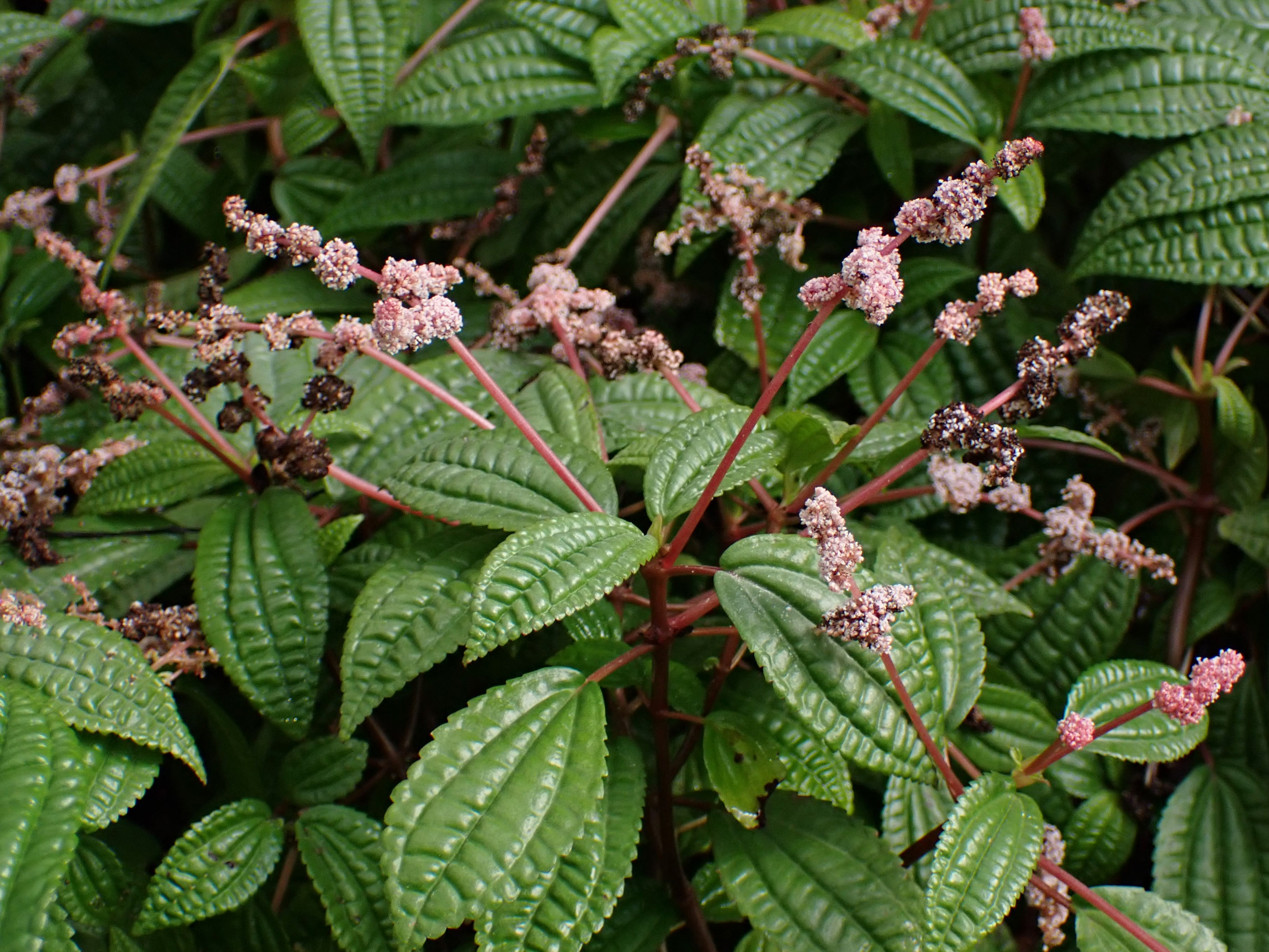

Scientific classification
- Kingdom: Plantae
- Clade: Tracheophytes
- Clade: Angiosperms
- Clade: Eudicots
- Clade: Rosids
- Order: Rosales
- Family: Urticaceae
- Genus: Pilea
- Species: P. crassifolia

Binomial name
- Pilea crassifolia (Willd.) Blume

= Pilea crassifolia =

Species of flowering plant

Pilea crassifolia is a plant native to Central and South America. One well-known cultivar, grown for its colorful foliage, is P. crassifolia 'Moon Valley'.
