= Pilea trichosanthes =

Conservation status
- Near Threatened (IUCN 3.1)

Scientific classification
- Kingdom: Plantae
- Clade: Tracheophytes
- Clade: Angiosperms
- Clade: Eudicots
- Clade: Rosids
- Order: Rosales
- Family: Urticaceae
- Genus: Pilea
- Species: P. trichosanthes

Binomial name
- Pilea trichosanthes Wedd.

Species of flowering plant

Pilea trichosanthes is a species of plant in the family Urticaceae. It is endemic to Ecuador. The natural habitats of Philea trichosanthes are subtropical or tropical moist lowland forests and subtropical or tropical moist montane forests.
