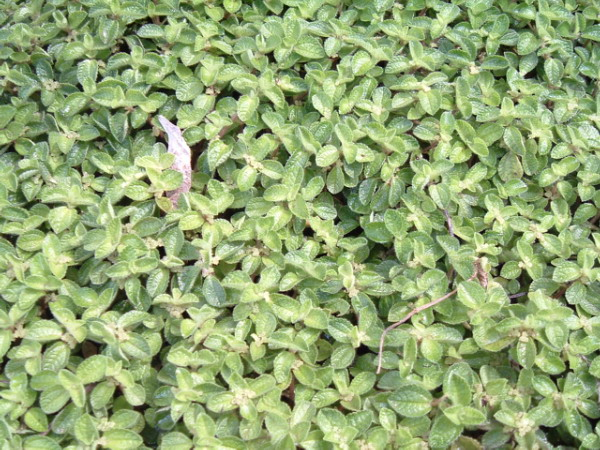

Scientific classification
- Kingdom: Plantae
- Clade: Tracheophytes
- Clade: Angiosperms
- Clade: Eudicots
- Clade: Rosids
- Order: Rosales
- Family: Urticaceae
- Genus: Pilea
- Species: P. nummulariifolia

Binomial name
- Pilea nummulariifolia (Sw.) Wedd.

= Pilea nummulariifolia =

Species of flowering plant

Pilea nummulariifolia is a perennial evergreen herbaceous plant commonly known as creeping charlie native to the Caribbean (including Florida) and northern South America. It can be grown indoors, for example in a hanging pot.
