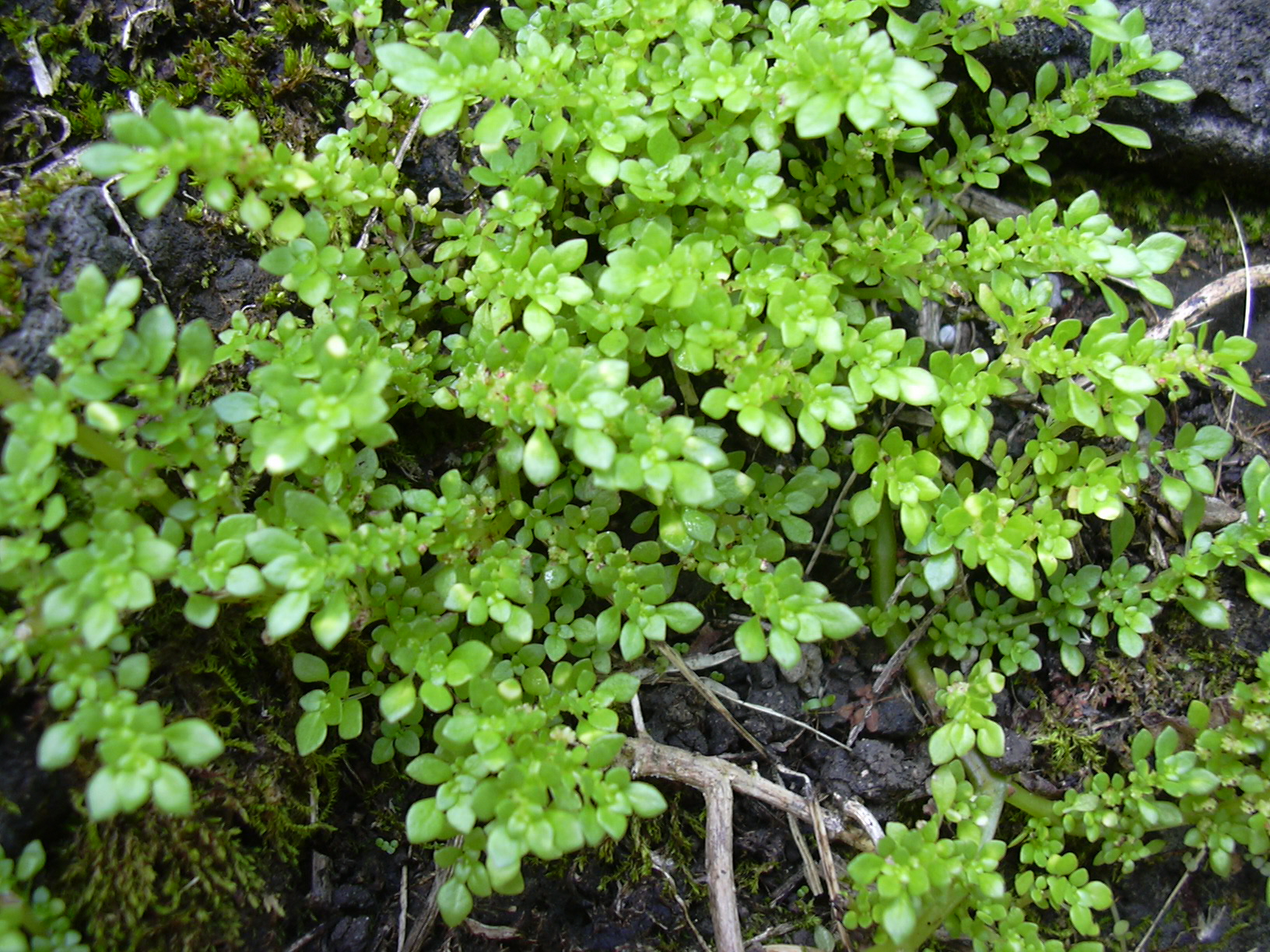
- Pilea Microphylla in Maui, Hawaii
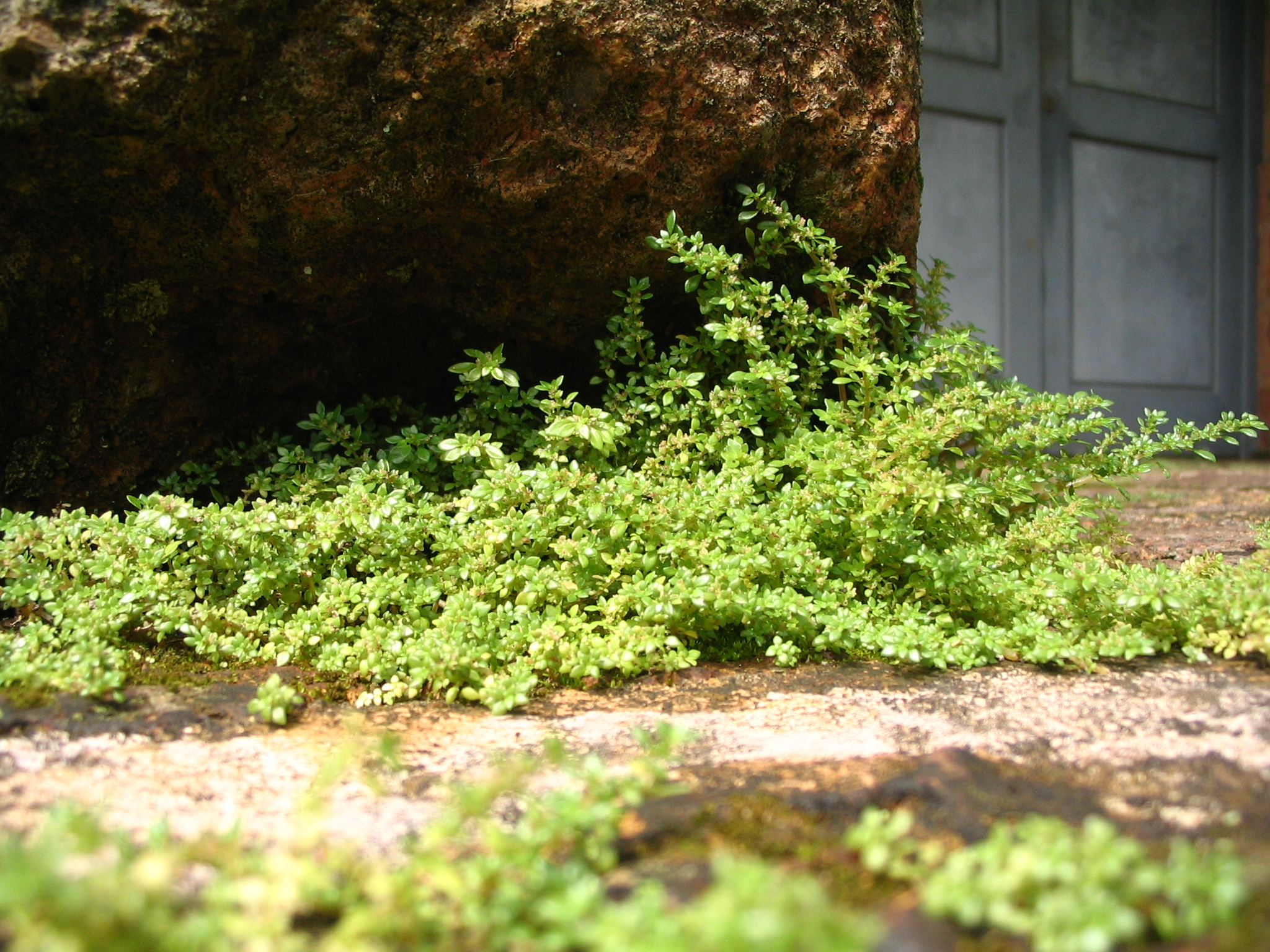
- Pilea microphylla in French Guiana

Scientific classification
- Kingdom: Plantae
- Clade: Embryophytes
- Clade: Tracheophytes
- Clade: Angiosperms
- Clade: Eudicots
- Clade: Rosids
- Order: Rosales
- Family: Urticaceae
- Genus: Pilea
- Species: P. microphylla

Binomial name
- Pilea microphylla (L.) Liebm.

= Pilea microphylla =

Artillery plant

Species of flowering plant

Pilea microphylla, also known as angeloweed, artillery plant, joypowder plant, lace plant, is an annual plant native to Florida, Mexico, the West Indies, and tropical Central and Southern America. In Guadeloupe and Martinique the local name is ti-teigne or teigne, and in Latin America it is brilhantina. In the southern part of México, specifically in the Yucatán peninsula, the local name is frescura. The plant belongs to the family Urticaceae. It has light green, almost succulent, stems and tiny leaves. It is grown as a ground cover in many areas.

== Description ==
Pilea microphylla is an annual or short-lived perennial. It grows low or creeping on the ground. It is monoecious (with both male and female flowers in a single plant) with smooth, translucent light-green, succulent-like and highly-branching stems. The leaves are oval-shaped, narrowing to a point at the tips, with a short petiole. They are tiny, averaging at 1.5 to 6 millimetres (0.059 to 0.236 in) long, and 2 to 5 millimetres (0.079 to 0.197 in) wide. The leaves grow in asymmetric pairs, with one leaf smaller than the other. Almost all leaves have three primary veins originating from the base. The whitish to greenish flowers are also tiny, averaging at 3 to 4 millimetres (0.12 to 0.16 in), with male flowers being larger than female flowers. It flowers year-round.

The common names of the plant (like "artillery plant", "joypowder plant", or "gunpowder plant") comes from the fact that the stamens of the male flowers explosively eject pollen grains during anthesis. This is due to the sudden straightening of the stamens.

== Propagation ==
Pilea microphylla can be propagated by dividing the root ball, or taking herbaceous cuttings and rooting them with rooting hormone. The plant enjoys a thorough watering after the soil has been allowed to dry, and misting has been shown to be beneficial. Direct sunlight causes the leaves to turn brown and fall off, so it prefers filtered light.

== Invasive species ==
Pilea microphylla has been introduced to various tropical and subtropical regions around the world. It is considered an invasive species in Australia, China, Diego Garcia, the Galapagos Islands, the Federated States of Micronesia, Fiji, French Polynesia, Guam, Hawaii, India, Indonesia, Japan, Kiribati, Marshall Islands, Nauru, New Caledonia, Niue, Palau, Papua New Guinea, the Philippines, Pitcairn Islands, Singapore, the Solomon Islands, Tonga, and Wallis and Futuna.

== Synonyms ==
- Pilea microphylla var. trianthemoides is a synonym of Pilea trianthemoides
