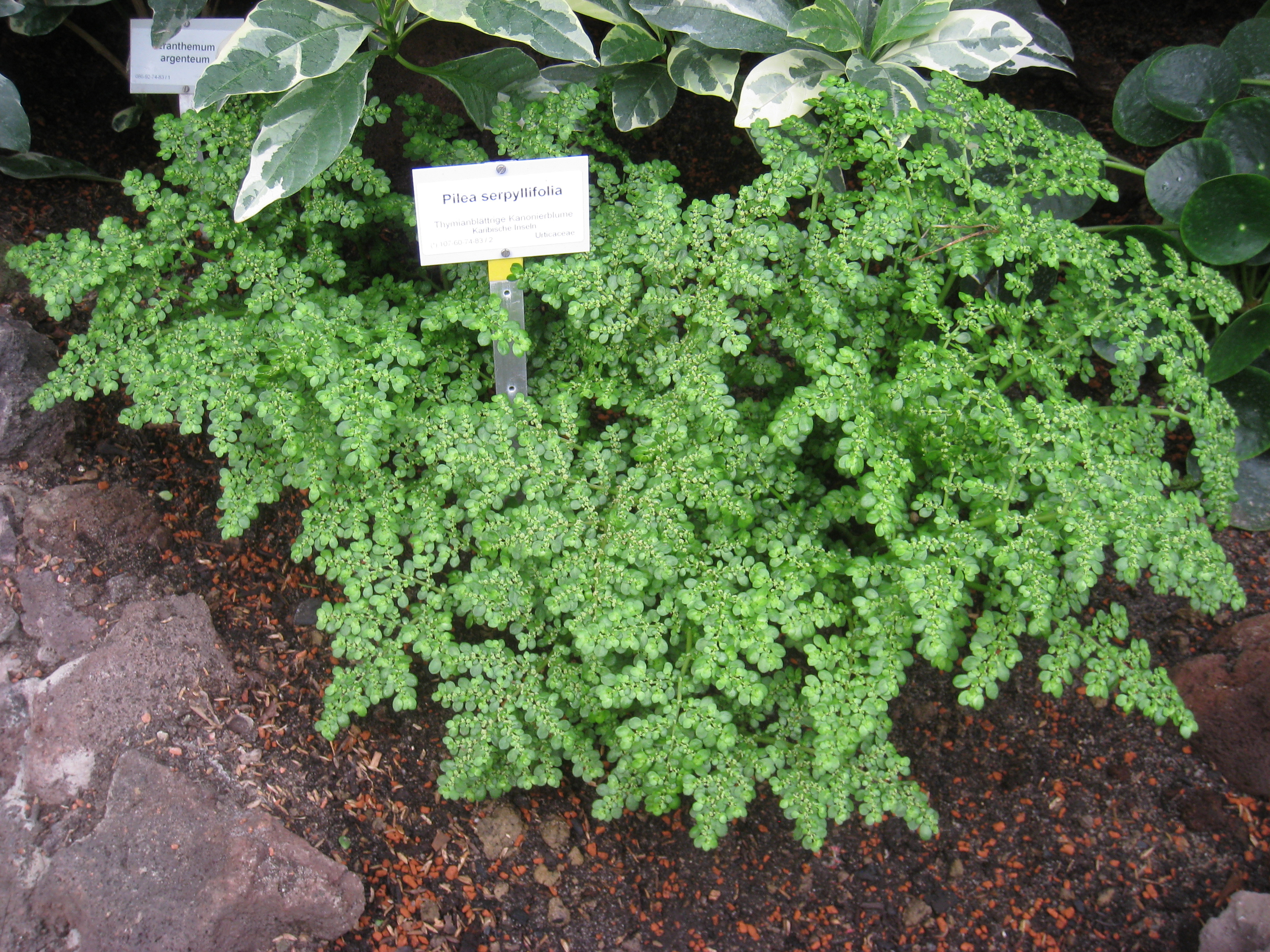
- Pilea trianthemoides (Pilea serpyllifolia)

Scientific classification
- Kingdom: Plantae
- Clade: Tracheophytes
- Clade: Angiosperms
- Clade: Eudicots
- Clade: Rosids
- Order: Rosales
- Family: Urticaceae
- Genus: Pilea
- Species: P. trianthemoides

Binomial name
- Pilea trianthemoides (Sw.) Lindl.

= Pilea trianthemoides =

Species of shrub

Pilea trianthemoides, the artillery plant, is a species of shrubs or subshrubs in the family Urticaceae, native to Florida and the Caribbean islands, where it grows in waste places and moist thickets. It flowers year round.

== Description ==
Pilea trianthemoides is a perennial, it lives and grows across multiple years rather than completing its life cycle in a single season. It is often mistaken for pilea microphylla because of its tiny succulent leaves, multi-branched stems and fern-like growth habit, but unlike pilea microphylla it had more resistance to droughts and tolerates soil drying between waterings. not only drought resistance pilea trianthemoides can also grow more stronger and taller than pilea microphylla with a height of 10 to 15cm tall but sometimes even 15 to 50cm tall.

== Propagation ==
Pilea trianthemoides can be propagated by using herbaceous stem cuttings and rooting them with rooting hormone or by dividing root ball.

== Synonyms ==
- Pilea microphylla var. trianthemoides
- Pilea serpyllifolia
- Urtica trianthemoides
