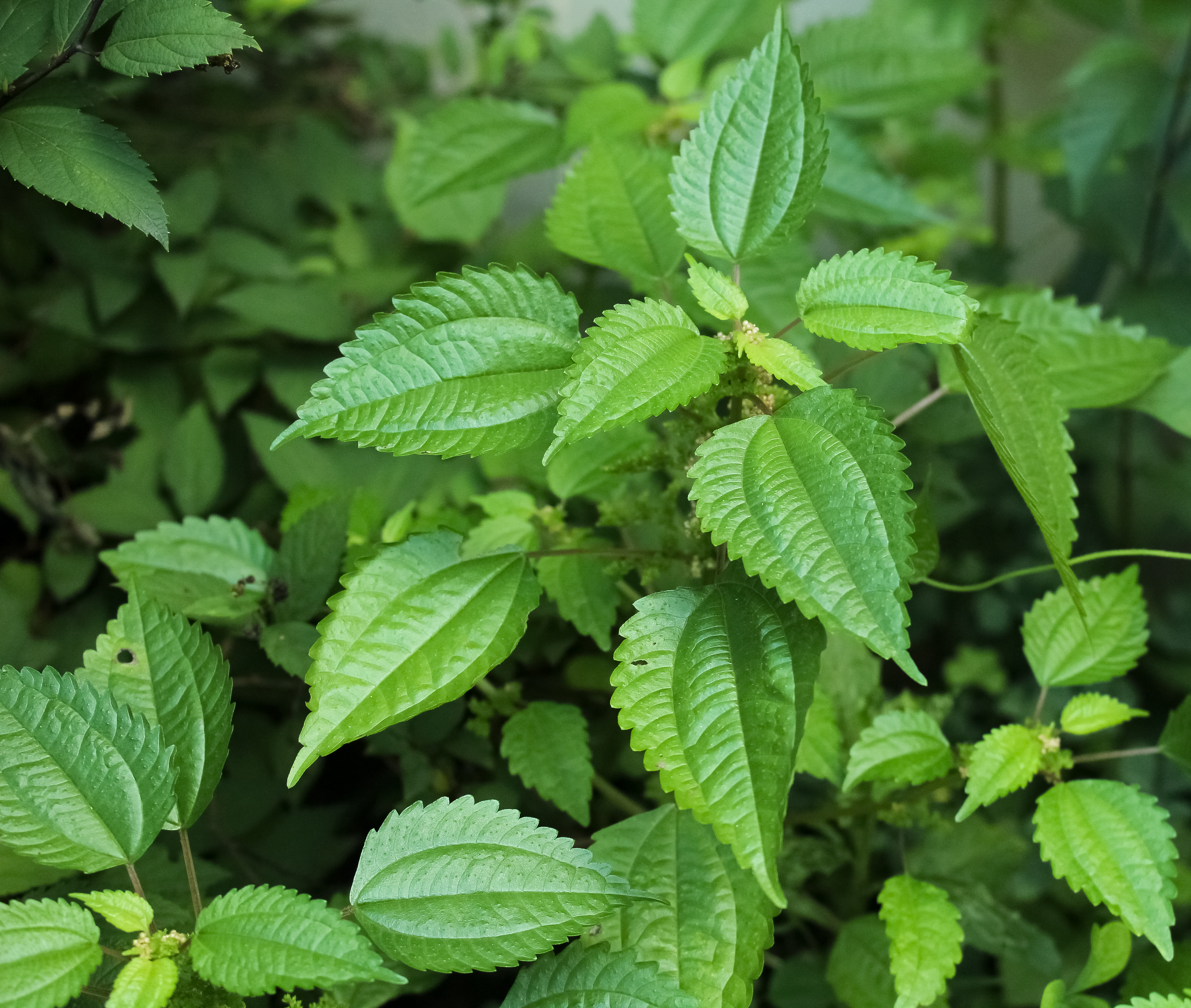

Scientific classification
- Kingdom: Plantae
- Clade: Tracheophytes
- Clade: Angiosperms
- Clade: Eudicots
- Clade: Rosids
- Order: Rosales
- Family: Urticaceae
- Genus: Pilea
- Species: P. pumila

Binomial name
- Pilea pumila (L.) A.Gray

= Pilea pumila =

Canadian Clearweed

Species of flowering plant

Pilea pumila, commonly known as clearweed, Canadian clearweed, coolwort or richweed, is an herbaceous plant in the nettle family (Urticaceae). It is native to Asia and eastern North America, where it is broadly distributed.

This plant is most often found in rich loamy soil, usually in moist to wet areas. Its natural habitat is in forests or other lightly shaded conditions. It is a common plant throughout its range, and forms large colonies where it is found. It grows in both high-quality habitats and in ecologically degraded areas. Due to its high tolerance for disturbance, it is often seen near buildings and as a garden weed.

== Description ==
Pilea pumila is an erect annual, growing 0.7 to 70 cm tall. The foliage is opposite, simple with dentate margins, wrinkly (with depressed veins), ovate, and with long petioles. Both the leaves and stems are translucent and bright green, turning bright yellow in autumn. The flowers are small, borne in axillary cymes, unisexual with both genders occurring on the same plant, greenish yellow, and pollinated by wind. Flowers bloom from midsummer through early autumn. Fruits (achenes) are green with purple markings. Roots are fibrous, shallow, and adventitious off the stem in moist areas or when in contact with the soil.

The plant is often mistaken for stinging nettle (Urtica dioica), but can be distinguished by the lack of trichomes, or stinging hairs, and the lower amount of branching of the inflorescences.

== Taxonomy ==
Three varieties of Pilea pumila are currently recognized. They are:

- P. pumila var. hamaoi - Found in China, Japan, and Korea
- P. pumila var. obtusifolia - Restricted to China
- P. pumila var. pumila - Widespread in North America and eastern Asia

Among the typical widespread variety pumila, minor differences do exist between the Asian and North American populations. Further taxonomic studies are needed to clarify what level of rank (if any) these differences warrant.

== Uses ==
Canadian clearweed is edible, but unpalatable. The plant can be used in classroom demonstrations of transpiration using food coloring due to its translucent stem. It was reportedly used medicinally by certain Native Americans for sinus issues, itch relief and to reduce hunger, and it is sometimes used as a diuretic in Asia.

== Ecology ==
The plant is host to various caterpillars, including the leaf-mining larvae of Cosmopterix pulchrimella, as well as the aphid Pseudasiphonaphis corni and leafhopper Empoasca recurvata.
