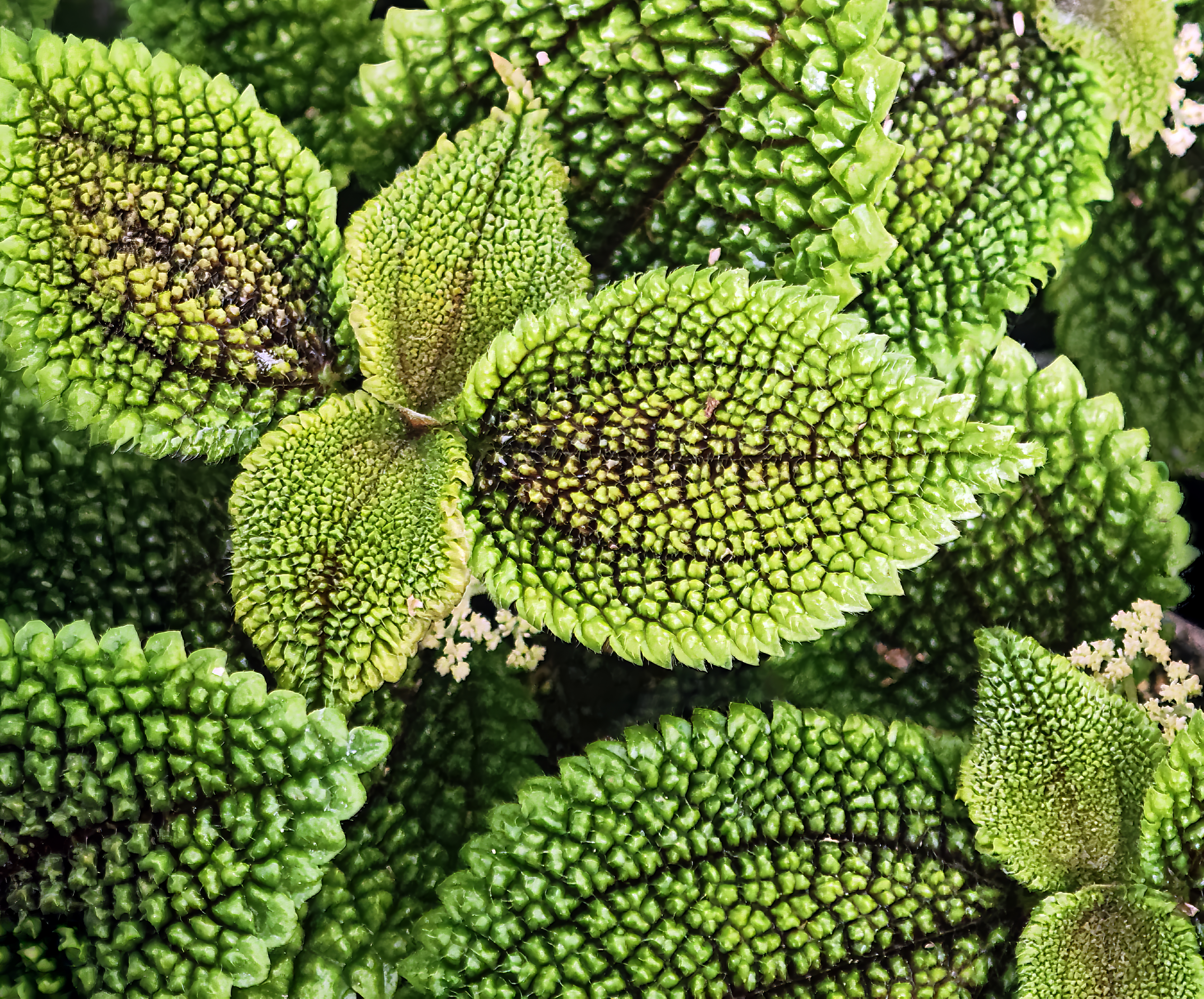

Scientific classification
- Kingdom: Plantae
- Clade: Tracheophytes
- Clade: Angiosperms
- Clade: Eudicots
- Clade: Rosids
- Order: Rosales
- Family: Urticaceae
- Genus: Pilea
- Species: P. mollis

Binomial name
- Pilea mollis Wedd.

= Pilea mollis =

Species of flowering plant

Pilea mollis is a species of flowering plant in the family Urticaceae. It is used as an ornamental plant, particularly the cultivar 'Moon Valley'.
