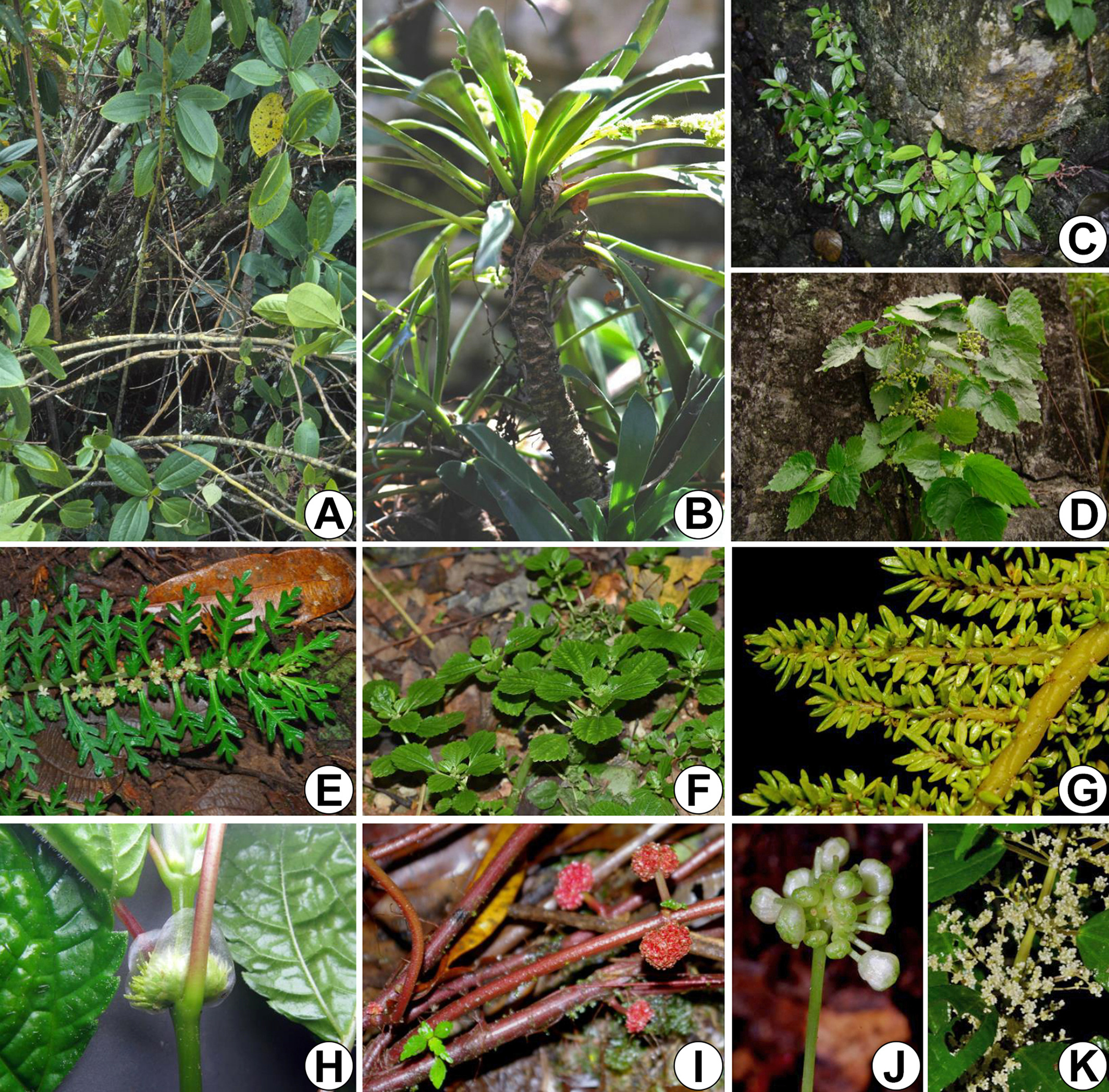
- Diversity of the genus Pilea

Scientific classification
- Kingdom: Plantae
- Clade: Embryophytes
- Clade: Tracheophytes
- Clade: Angiosperms
- Clade: Eudicots
- Clade: Rosids
- Order: Rosales
- Family: Urticaceae
- Tribe: Elatostemateae
- Genus: Pilea; Lindl. (1821)

Species
- 606; see text

Synonyms
- Adicea Raf. (1824); Adike Raf. (1836); Chamaecnide Nees & Mart. ex Miq. (1853); Dubrueilia Gaudich. (1830); Haroldiella J.Florence (1997); Neopilea Leandri (1950); Sarcopilea Urb. (1912); Therebina Noronha (1790), nom. nud.

= Pilea =

Genus of plants

Pilea, with 600–715 species, is the largest genus of flowering plants in the nettle family Urticaceae.

It is distributed throughout the tropics, subtropics, and warm temperate regions (with the exception of Australia and New Zealand).

== Description ==
The majority of species are shade-loving herbaceous plants or shrubs, which are easily distinguished from other Urticaceae by the combination of opposite leaves (with rare exceptions) with a single ligulate intrapetiolar stipule in each leaf axil and cymose or paniculate inflorescences (again with rare exceptions).

== Uses ==
Pilea is of little economic importance; one species is used in Chinese traditional medicine (P. plataniflora).

=== Horticulture ===
Six species have horticultural value (P. cadierei, P. grandifolia, P. involucrata, P. microphylla, P. nummulariifolia, and P. peperomioides), Some pileas are grown for their ornamental foliage which is shaped like lily-pads.

The ASPCA includes many pilea species in the list of plants that are non-toxic to pets.

== Systematics ==
The genus has attracted little monographic attention since Weddell (1869), and the majority of taxonomic contributions have come from floristic treatments. To date, 787 species names have been published (International Plant Names Index, 2003) and estimates for the species number range from 250 to 1000. Based on previous floristic treatments, about 30% of the species from regions not yet covered by contemporary floristic treatments may be undescribed.

The genus name Pilea is Latin for "felt cap", a reference to the calyx covering the achene.

== Selected species ==
- Pilea cadierei — aluminium plant
- Pilea cataractae
- Pilea cavernicola
- Pilea crassifolia
- Pilea depressa
- Pilea elegans
- Pilea fontana
- Pilea glaucophylla
- Pilea grandifolia
- Pilea involucrata — friendship plant
- Pilea jamesonia
- Pilea laevicaulis
- Pilea microphylla — artillery plant, gunpowder plant
- Pilea mollis — Moon Valley plant
- Pilea myriophylla
- Pilea napoana
- Pilea nummulariifolia — creeping Charlie
- Pilea peperomioides — Chinese money plant, missionary plant
- Pilea pollicaris
- Pilea pumila — Canadian clearweed
- Pilea repens — black-leaf panamiga
- Pilea riopalenquensis
- Pilea schimpfii
- Pilea selbyanorum
- Pilea serpyllacea
- Pilea serratifolia
- Pilea spruceana
- Pilea topensis
- Pilea trianthemoides
- Pilea trichosanthes
- Pilea trilobata
- Pilea tungurahuae
- Pilea victoriae

== Fossil record ==
The fossil species †Pilea cantalensis was widely distributed in Europe and West Siberia during the Miocene and Pliocene. It is related to the East Asian Pilea mongolica and to the North American Pilea pumila.
