= Circe (disambiguation) =

Circe is a goddess or sorceress in Greek mythology.

Circe or Circé may also refer to:

== Places ==
- Mount Circe, a mountain peak in Antarctica
- Dome C, also known as Dome Circe, a summit or dome of the Antarctic Ice Sheet

== Books, theatre and film ==
- Circe (character), a DC comics character
- Circe, the Enchantress, a 1924 film with Mae Murray
- Circe (film), a 1964 Argentine drama
- Circe (novel), a 2018 mythic fantasy by Madeline Miller
- "Circe" (Ulysses episode), an episode in James Joyce's novel Ulysses
- Circe, a character in the TV series Generator Rex
- La Circe, a 1624 poem by Lope de Vega
- Circe (play), a 1677 tragedy by Charles Davenant
- Circé, a machine play by Thomas Corneille

== Music ==
- Circé (Desmarets), a 1694 opera by Henri Desmarets
- La Circe (Ziani), a 1665 opera by Pietro Antonio Ziani
- La Circe, a 1668 serenata by Alessandro Stradella
- La Circe (Mysliveček), a 1779 opera by Josef Mysliveček
- La Circe, a 1782 opera by Cimarosa
- La Circe, a 1789 pasticcio by Haydn

== Ships ==
- Circe, a Spica class torpedo boat of the Royal Italian Navy
- Circé-class submarine (disambiguation), either of two classes of submarines of the French Navy
- French ship Circé, any of several French Navy ships
- HMS Circe, any of several ships of the British Royal Navy
- USS Circe, either of two United States Navy ships

== Other uses ==
- Circe (bivalve), a genus of venus clams
- Circe chess, a variant of chess
- Hestina nama, a brush-footed butterfly commonly known as the Circe
- Circe, a synonym for Aglantha, a genus of deep-sea hydrozoans
- Circe (painting), an 1885 painting by John Collier
- 34 Circe, a large main-belt asteroid

== See also ==
- Cersei Lannister, a character in the A Song of Ice and Fire epic fantasy novel series by George R.R. Martin, and its television series Game of Thrones
- Sersi, a character in Marvel Comics
  - Sersi (Marvel Cinematic Universe), the film version of the character
