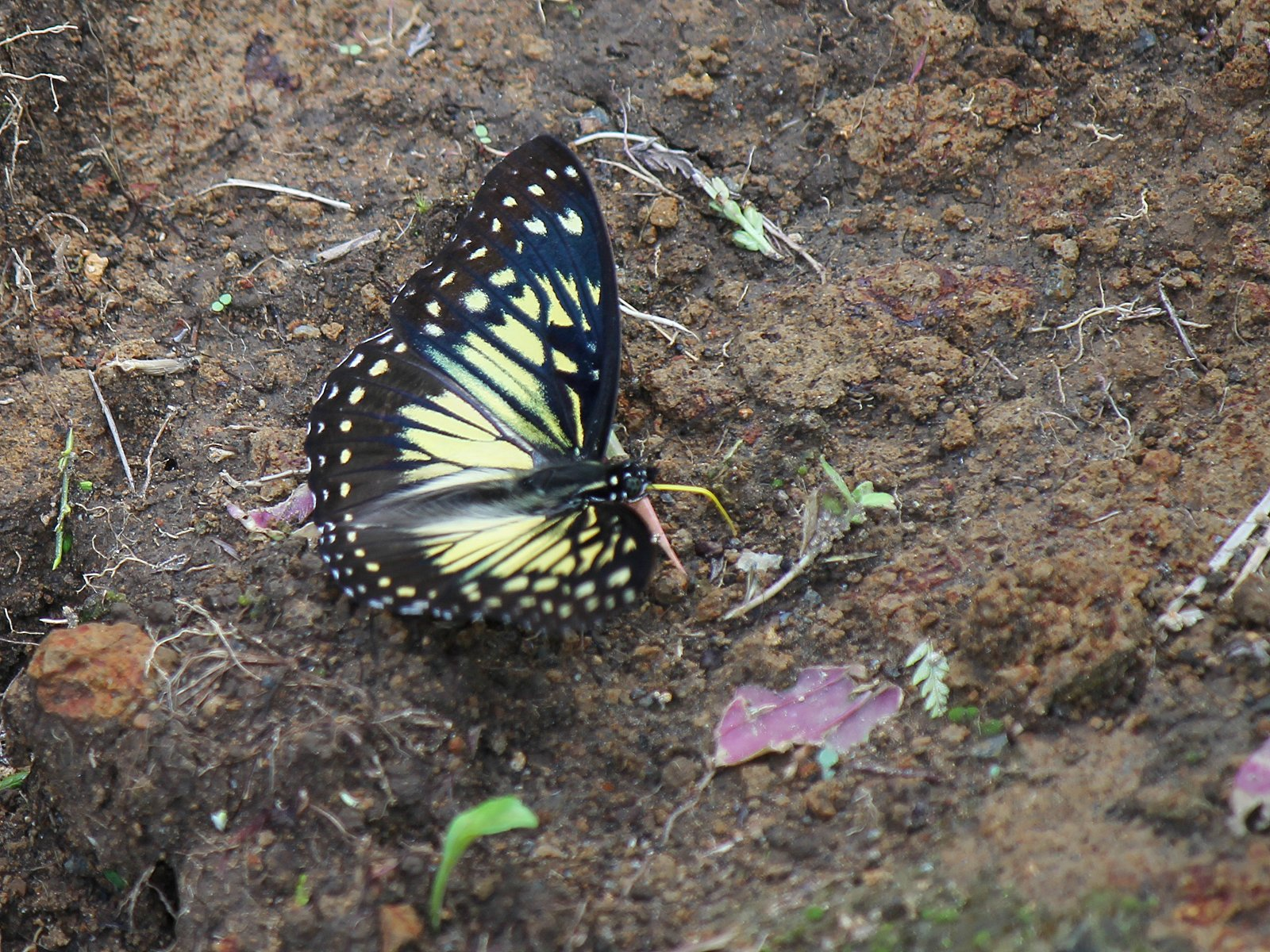

Scientific classification
- Domain: Eukaryota
- Kingdom: Animalia
- Phylum: Arthropoda
- Class: Insecta
- Order: Lepidoptera
- Family: Nymphalidae
- Subfamily: Apaturinae
- Genus: Hestinalis; Bryk, 1938

Species
- Hestinalis divona or Hestina divona; Hestinalis mimetica or Hestina mimetica; Hestinalis nama or Hestina nama

= Hestinalis =

Genus of brush-footed butterflies

Hestinalis is a genus of butterflies in the family Nymphalidae. Some authors consider Hestinalis and Hestina as one genus, though phylogenetic analysis has shown Hestinalis nama not to be grouped with Hestina, as had been described in previous literature.
