= Cerci =

Cerci may refer to:

== Surname ==
- Alessio Cerci (born 1987), Italian footballer
- Ferhat Cerci (born 1981), German footballer of Turkish descent
- Selina Cerci (born 2000), German footballer with Arsenal W.F.C.

== Places ==
- Çerçi, Bayburt, a village in Bayburt Province, Turkey
- Çerçi, Şabanözü

== Biology ==
- Cercis, a genus of the pea family Fabaceae
- Cercus (singular form of cerci), an arthropod appendage

== See also ==
- Circe (disambiguation)
