= French ship Circé =

At least three ships of the French Navy have borne the name Circé:

- French cruiser Circé, an unprotected cruiser
- French submarine Circé (1907), a Circé-class submarine launched in 1907 and sunk in 1918
- French submarine Circé (Q125), a Circé-class submarine launched in 1925. Seized in 1942 by Italy and renamed FR117 and scuttled in 1943

== See also ==
- Circé-class submarine, two submarine classes of the French Navy
