= French ship Guêpe =

Eight ships of the French Navy have borne the name Guêpe ("wasp"):

== Ships named Guêpe ==
- Guêpe (1778), a 10-gun cutter captured from the British
- Gasparin (1794), a 3-gun gunboat, bore the name Guêpe during her career.
- Guêpe (1798), a 16-gun brig
- Cannonière n°11 (1866), a gunboat, bore the name Guêpe during her career.
- Guêpe (1904), a defence submarine, lead ship of her class.
- Guêpe (1911), a patrol boat
- Guêpe (1916), an auxiliary minelaying ship, seized from a German company
- Guêpe (1941), a high sea tug

== See also ==
- HMS Wasp

== Notes and references ==
Notes

Bibliography

- Roche, Jean-Michel (2005a). Dictionnaire des bâtiments de la flotte de guerre française de Colbert à nos jours. Vol. 1. Group Retozel-Maury Millau. ISBN 978-2-9525917-0-6. OCLC 165892922.
- Roche, Jean-Michel (2005b). Dictionnaire des bâtiments de la flotte de guerre française de Colbert à nos jours. Vol. 2. Group Retozel-Maury Millau. ISBN 978-2-9525917-0-6. OCLC 165892922.
