= Q48 =

Q48 may refer to:

- Q48 (New York City bus)
- Al-Fath, a surah of the Quran
- French submarine Calypso (1907)
