= Circé-class submarine =

Circé-class submarine may refer to one of the following classes of submarine for the French Navy:

- Circé-class submarine (1907) in service 1909–1918
- Circé-class submarine (1925) in service 1927–1942

== See also ==
- French ship Circé, various ships and submarines of the French Navy
