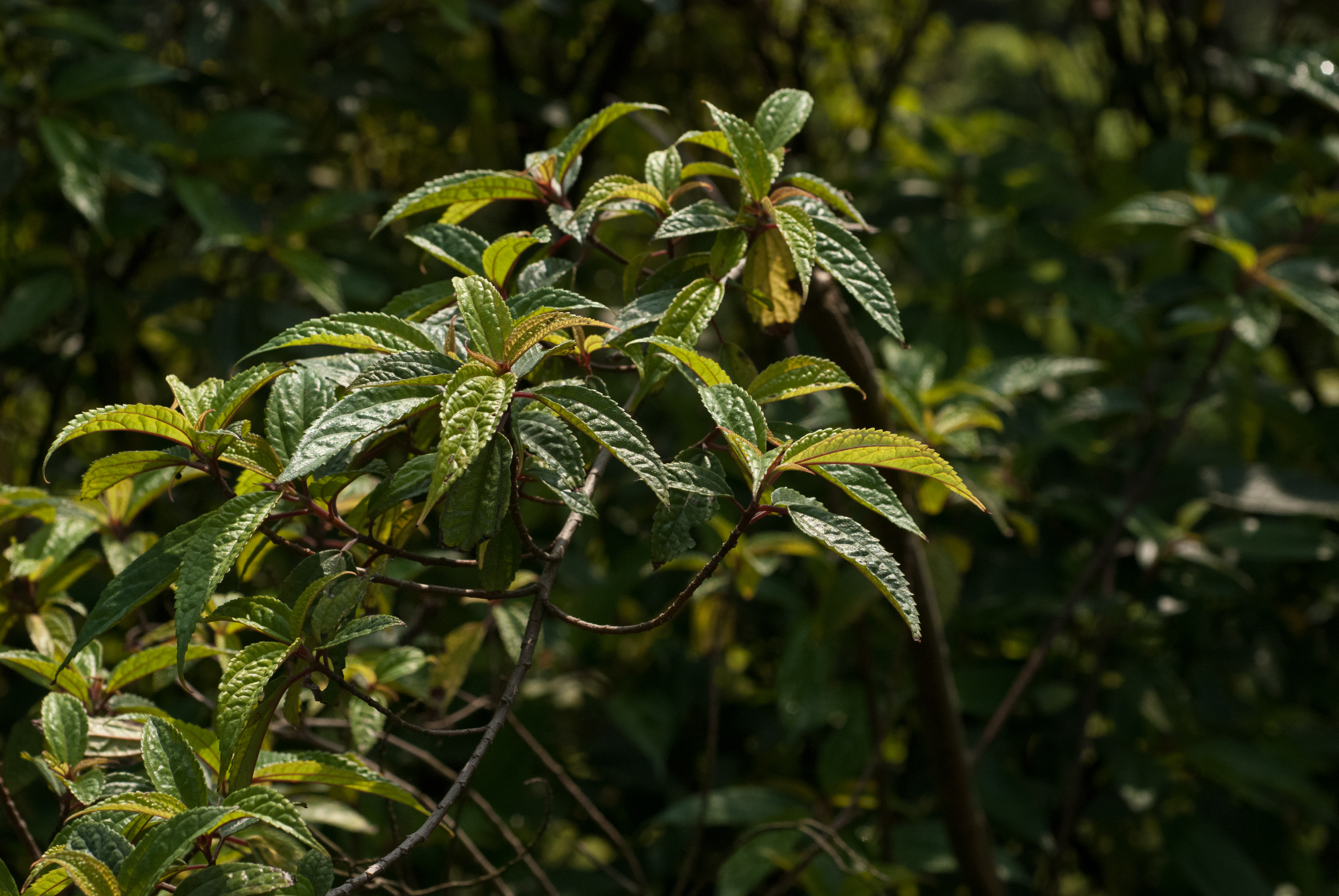
- Leaves
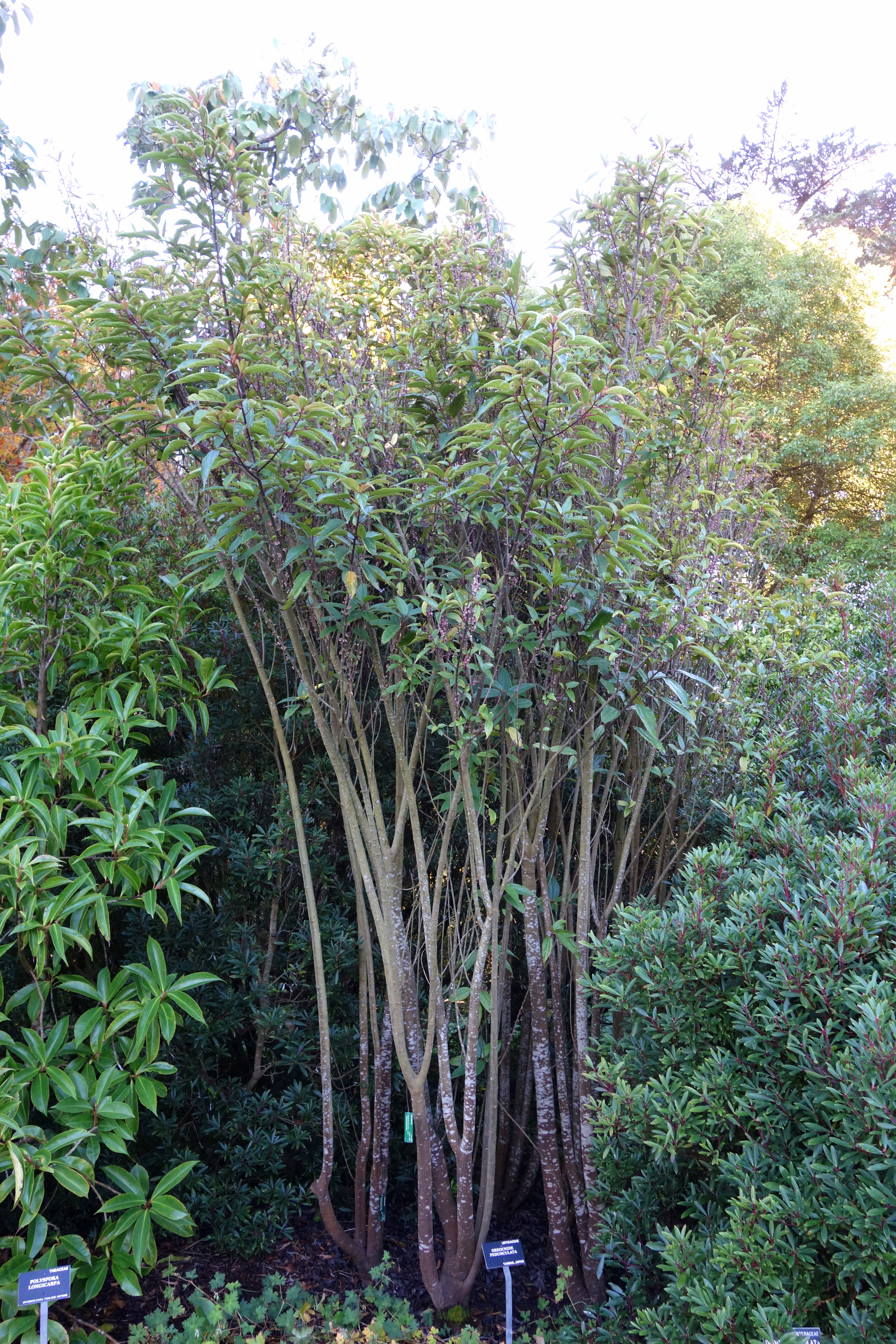
- Habit

Conservation status
- Least Concern (IUCN 3.1)

Scientific classification
- Kingdom: Plantae
- Clade: Tracheophytes
- Clade: Angiosperms
- Clade: Eudicots
- Clade: Rosids
- Order: Rosales
- Family: Urticaceae
- Genus: Oreocnide
- Species: O. pedunculata

Binomial name
- Oreocnide pedunculata (Shirai) Masam.

Synonyms
- Villebrunea pedunculata Shirai

= Oreocnide pedunculata =

Species of plant

Oreocnide pedunculata, the purple woodnettle or longpedicel woodnettle, is a species of flowering plant in the family Urticaceae, native to south-central and southern Japan, the Ryukyu Islands, and Taiwan. A shrub or small tree 2 to 5 m (7 to 16 ft) tall, it is found growing in valleys and forest edges at elevations ranging from 100 to 1,200 m (300 to 3,900 ft). Its leaves are an important food source for Formosan rock macaques (Macaca cyclopis) and Japanese macaques (Macaca fuscata).
