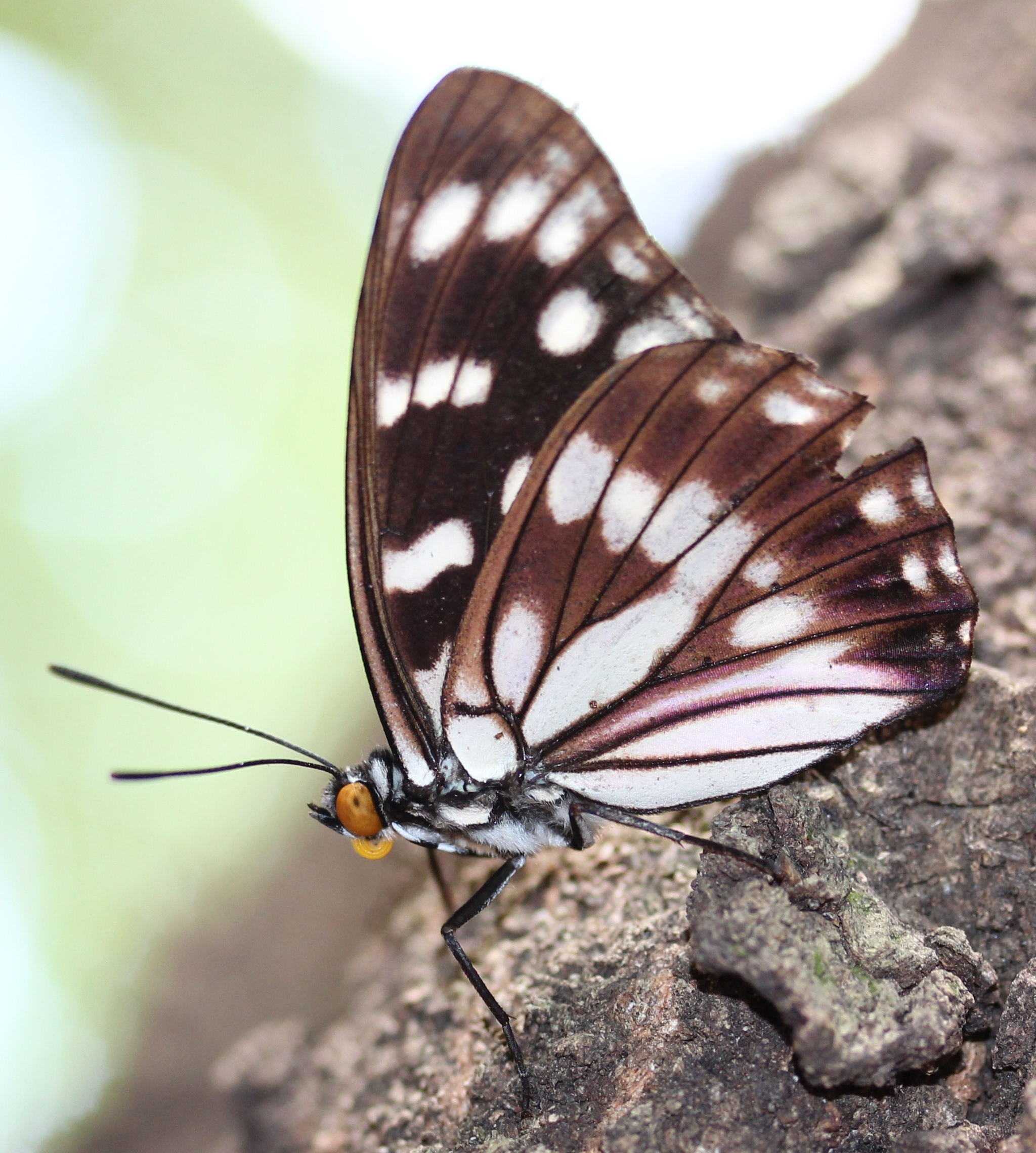

Scientific classification
- Domain: Eukaryota
- Kingdom: Animalia
- Phylum: Arthropoda
- Class: Insecta
- Order: Lepidoptera
- Family: Nymphalidae
- Genus: Hestina
- Species: H. persimilis

Binomial name
- Hestina persimilis (Westwood, [1850])

Synonyms
- Diadema persimilis Westwood, [1850]; Hestina zella Butler, 1869; Euripus japonicus var. chinensis Leech, 1890; Hestina subviridis Leech, 1891; Hestina yankowskyi Grose-Smith & Kirby, 1891; Hestina subviridis f. yankowskii Stichel in Seitz

= Hestina persimilis =

Species of butterfly

Hestina persimilis, the siren, is an East Palearctic species of siren butterfly (Apaturinae) found in western China, Simla to Assam, Orissa. The larva feeds on Celtis australis.

== Subspecies ==
- H. p. persimilis (Nepal, Sikkim, Bhutan)
- H. p. zella Butler, 1869 (Kashmir)
- H. p. chinensis (Leech, 1890) (West China)
