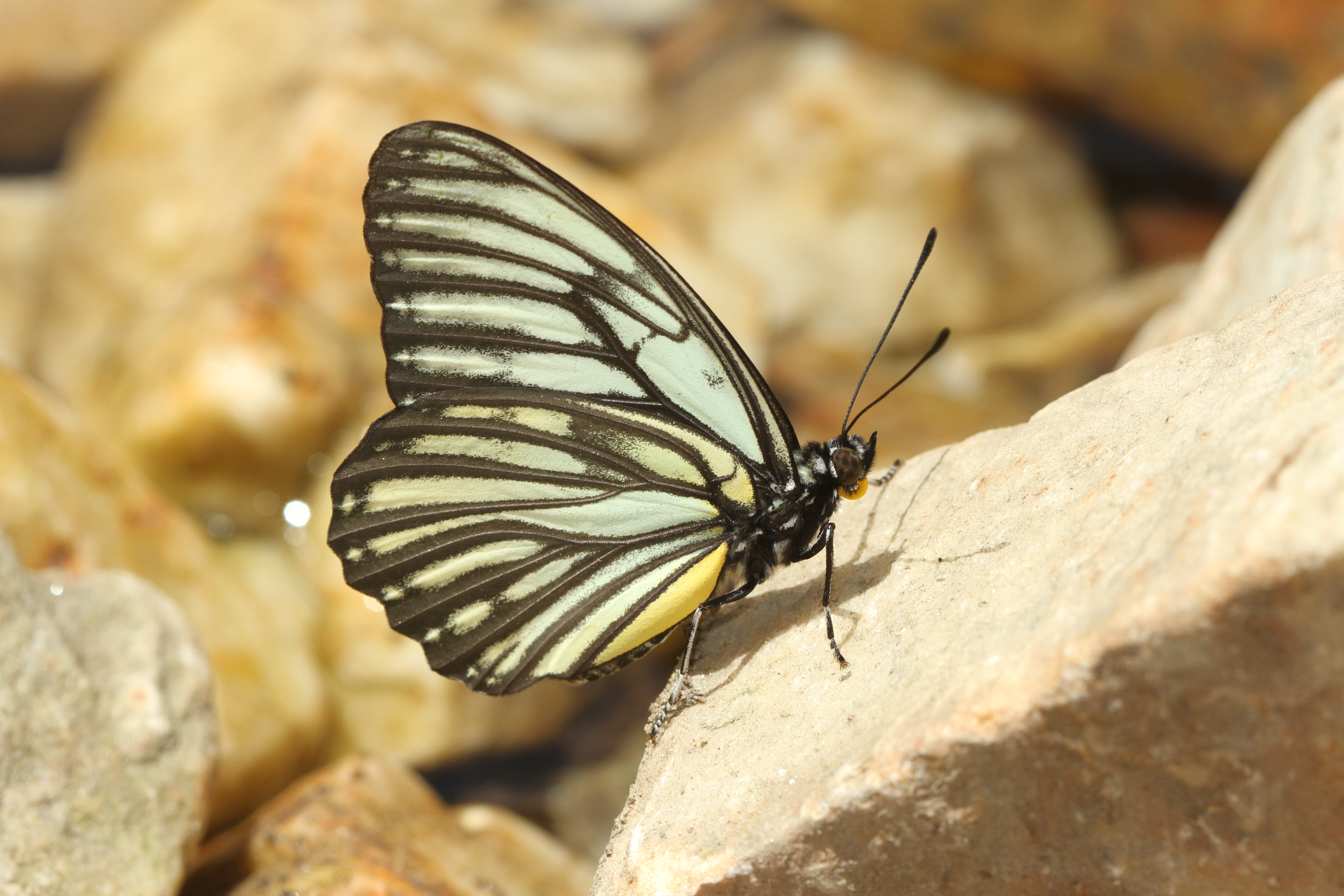
- In Himachal Pradesh, India

Scientific classification
- Domain: Eukaryota
- Kingdom: Animalia
- Phylum: Arthropoda
- Class: Insecta
- Order: Lepidoptera
- Family: Nymphalidae
- Genus: Hestina
- Species: H. nicevillei

Binomial name
- Hestina nicevillei (Moore, [1895])

Synonyms
- Parhestina nicevillei Moore, [1895]; Diagora nicevillei; Parhestina jermyni Druce, 1911; Hestina ouvradi Riley, 1939

= Hestina nicevillei =

Species of butterfly

Hestina nicevillei, the scarce siren, is a species of siren butterfly (Apaturinae) found in the western Himalayas, Himachal Pradesh, Nepal and to China and Vietnam.

== Subspecies ==
- H. n. nicevillei (western Himalayas, Himachal Pradesh, Nepal)
- H. n. jermyni (Druce, 1911) (central Himalayas)
- H. n. ouvradi Riley, 1939 (China (Yunnan, south-east Tibet))
- H. n. nigra Morishita, 1997 (central Nepal)
- H. n. magna Omoto & Funahashi, 2004 (northern Vietnam)
