= HMS Circe =

Six ships of the Royal Navy have been named HMS Circe, after the Greek goddess Circe.

- The first HMS Circe (1785) was a 28-gun sixth rate launched in 1785 and wrecked in 1803.
- The second HMS Circe (1804) was a 32-gun fifth rate launched in 1804 and sold in 1814.
- The third HMS Circe (1827) was a 46-gun fifth rate launched in 1827, confined to harbour service in 1866, renamed HMS Impregnable in 1916 and sold 1922.
- The fourth HMS Circe (1892) was a torpedo gunboat in service from 1892 to 1920.
- The fifth HMS Circe (1939) was an auxiliary minesweeper requisitioned in 1939 and transferred to the Royal Australian Navy as HMAS Medea in 1942.
- The sixth HMS Circe (1942) was a minesweeper launched in 1942 and broken up 1967.
