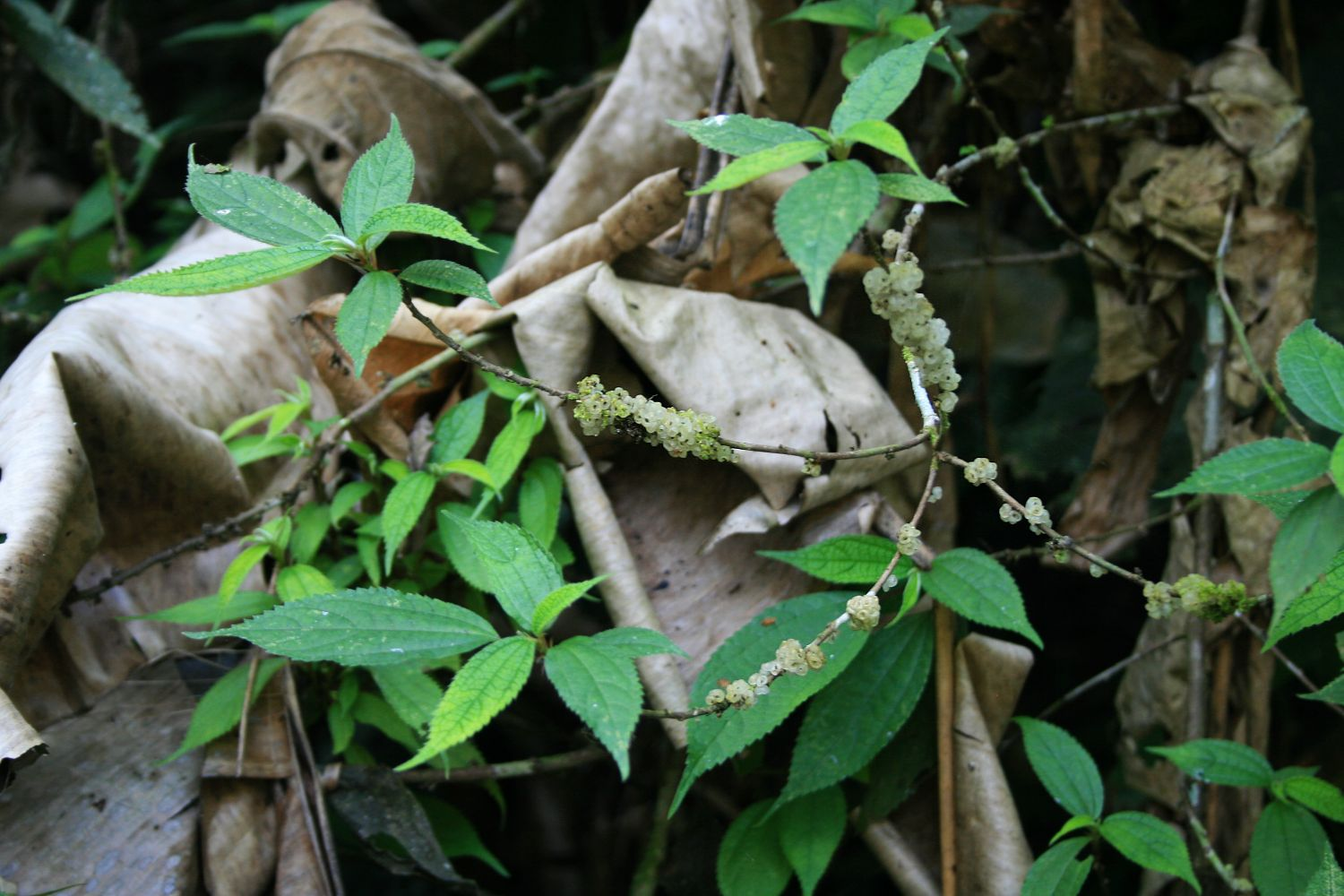

Scientific classification
- Kingdom: Plantae
- Clade: Embryophytes
- Clade: Tracheophytes
- Clade: Spermatophytes
- Clade: Angiosperms
- Clade: Eudicots
- Clade: Rosids
- Order: Rosales
- Family: Urticaceae
- Genus: Oreocnide
- Species: O. frutescens

Binomial name
- Oreocnide frutescens (Thunb.) Miq.

Synonyms
- Debregeasia edulis (Siebold & Zucc.) Wedd.

= Oreocnide frutescens =

Species of plant

Oreocnide frutescens, the 紫麻 (tsyma), is a species of flowering plant in the family Urticaceae, native to southern and eastern Asia. It typically grows as a 1-3 m tall shrub or small tree; branchlets and petioles are purplish brown; the stem fibres are used to make ropes. The yellow fruits are pleasantly sweet, their flavour is said to resemble strawberries. The species contains four recognized infraspecifics: subsp. frutescens, subsp. insignis, subsp. nivea and subs. occidentalis.
