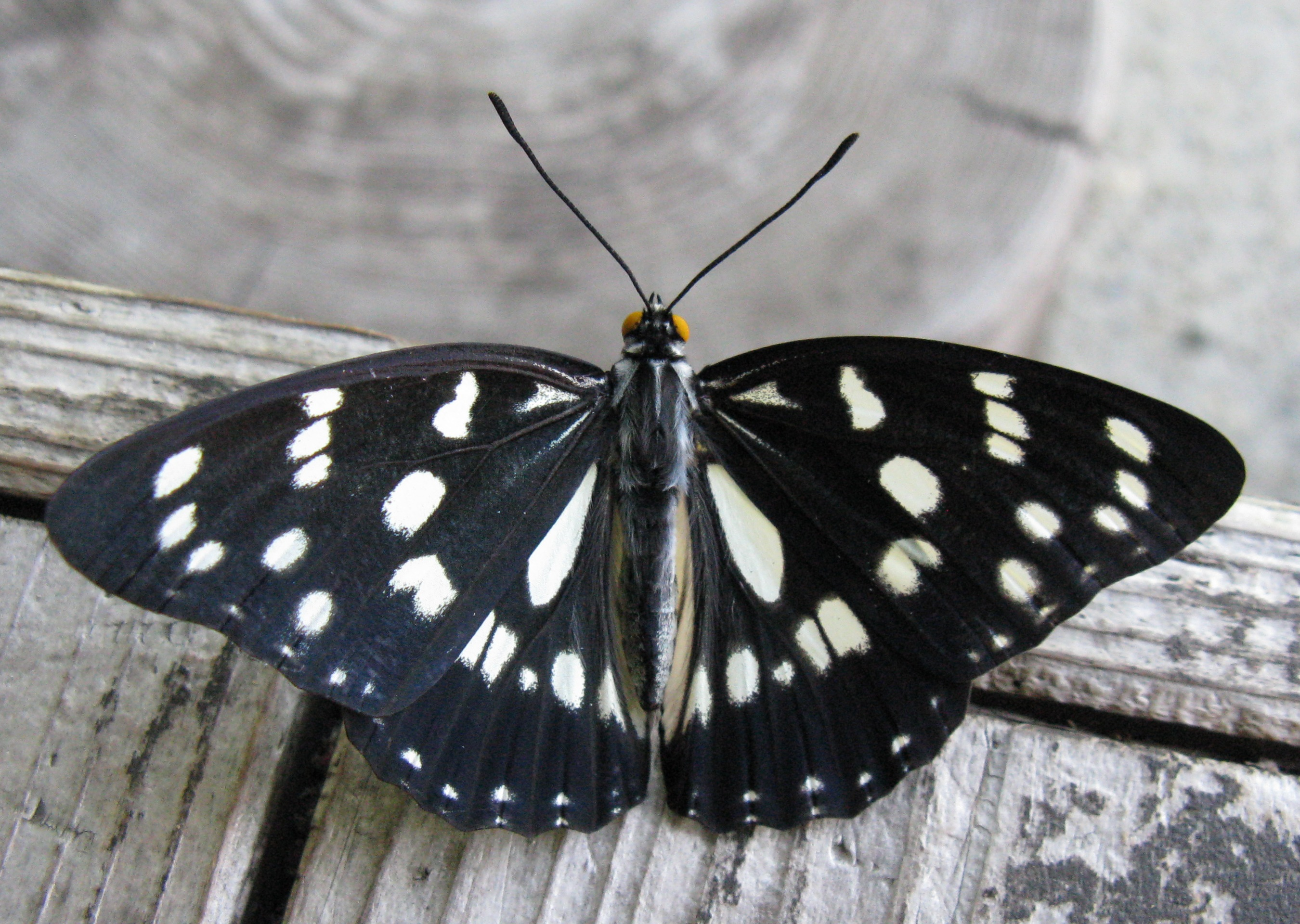
- Hestina persimilis japonica

Scientific classification
- Domain: Eukaryota
- Kingdom: Animalia
- Phylum: Arthropoda
- Class: Insecta
- Order: Lepidoptera
- Family: Nymphalidae
- Subfamily: Apaturinae
- Genus: Hestina; Westwood, 1850

= Hestina =

Genus of brush-footed butterflies

Hestina is a genus of butterflies in the family Nymphalidae subfamily Apaturinae. The genus is found in the East Palearctic and Southeast Asia.

Known larval food plants are Celtis and, for one species, Trema (Ulmaceae). These include Celtis boninensis Japan, Celtis formosana Taiwan, Celtis nervosa Taiwan, Celtis jessoensis, Celtis sinensis, Trema orientalis. Hestina nama larvae feed on Oreocnide (Urticaceae).

== Species ==
In alphabetical order:

- Hestina assimilis (Linnaeus, 1758)
- Hestina dissimilis Hall, 1935
- Hestina divona (Hewitson, 1861) – Sulawesi sorcerer
- Hestina japonica (C. & R. Felder, 1862)
- Hestina jermyni Druce, 1911
- Hestina mena Moore, 1858
- Hestina mimetica Butler, 1874
- Hestina nama (Doubleday, 1844) – Circe
- Hestina namoides de Nicéville, 1900
- Hestina nicevillei (Moore, [1895])
- Hestina ouvradi Riley, 1939
- Hestina persimilis (Westwood, [1850]) – Siren
- Hestina risna
- Hestina waterstradti Watkins, 1928
