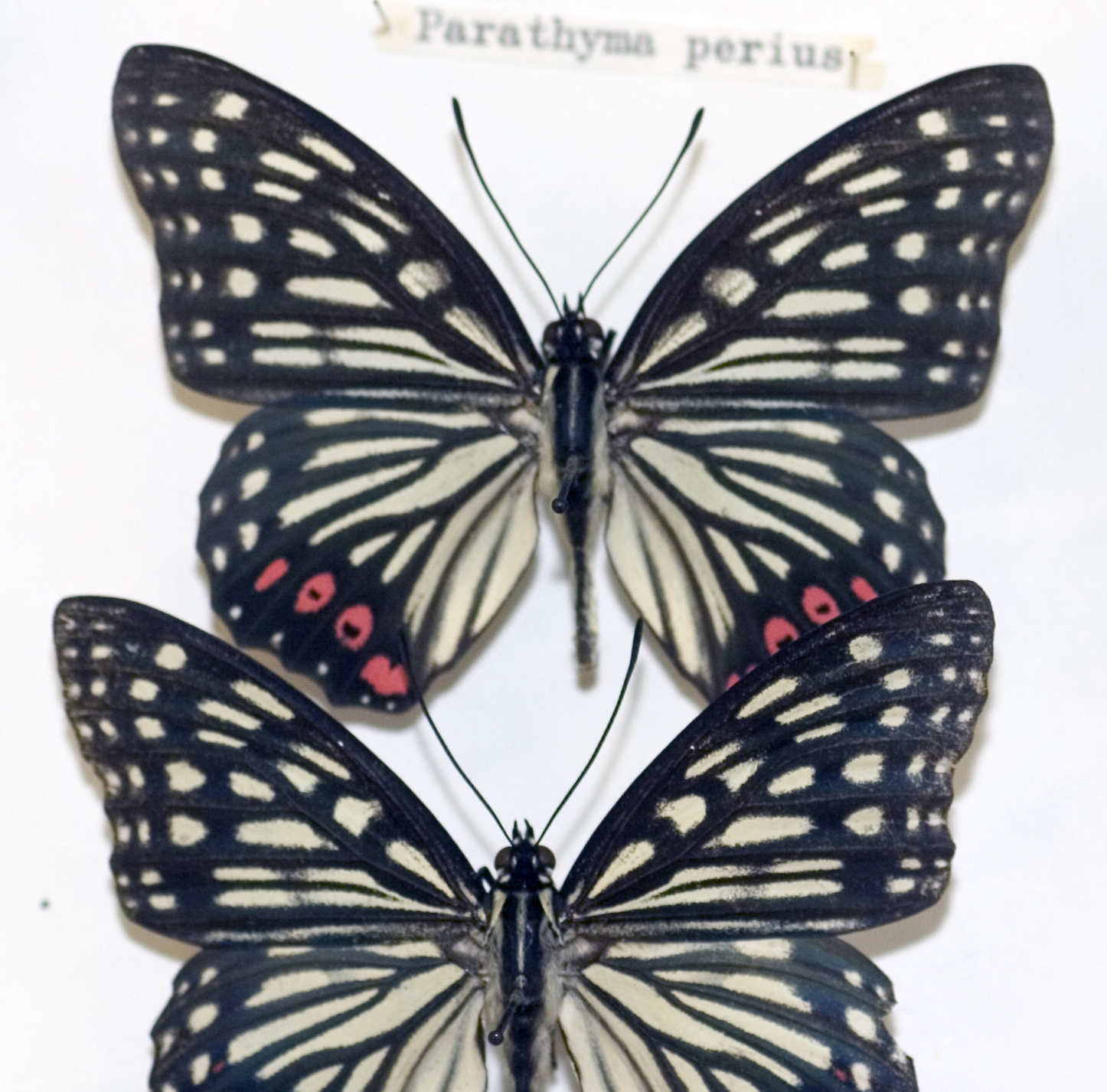

Scientific classification
- Kingdom: Animalia
- Phylum: Arthropoda
- Clade: Pancrustacea
- Class: Insecta
- Order: Lepidoptera
- Family: Nymphalidae
- Genus: Hestina
- Species: H. assimilis

Binomial name
- Hestina assimilis (Linnaeus, 1758)

Synonyms
- Papilio assimilis Linnaeus, 1758

= Hestina assimilis =

Species of butterfly

Hestina assimilis, the red ring skirt, is a species of butterfly in the family Nymphalidae found in Asia. It is generally of large size, and is named for the row of red submarginal spots on the hindwing of summer-generation adults. The species is saprophagous, with adults feeding on tree sap, rotting fruit and dung rather than nectar.

The species is native to northern Vietnam, southern and eastern continental China, the Korean Peninsula and adjacent islands, and to the Amami Islands of Japan, where the endemic subspecies H. a. shirakii occurs. A separate population of the continental nominate subspecies became established in central Honshu in the late 1990s and is treated in Japan as an invasive alien species.

== Taxonomy and subspecies ==
Four subspecies are generally recognised:

- H. a. assimilis (Linnaeus, 1758) – northern Vietnam, southern and eastern continental China, the Korean Peninsula and adjacent islands including Jeju
- H. a. formosana Moore – Taiwan
- H. a. shirakii Shirôzu, 1955 – Amami Islands, Japan
- H. a. imperfecta Bryk, 1946

The pale winter/spring phenotype formerly treated as H. a. f. nigrivena (Leech, 1890) is a seasonal form rather than a subspecies (see Seasonal forms).

=== Hestina assimilis shirakii ===
Hestina assimilis shirakii Shirôzu, 1955 is the only subspecies native to Japan. It is restricted to Amami Ōshima and its satellite islands and Tokunoshima in the Amami Islands; older records exist from Okinawa Island but the subspecies has not been confirmed there in recent decades.

Unlike mainland populations, which use Celtis sinensis, larvae of H. a. shirakii feed on Celtis boninensis (Japanese: kuwanoha-enoki or Ryūkyū-enoki), the hackberry species native to the Ryukyu Islands. The subspecies also does not produce the whitened spring morph characteristic of mainland H. a. assimilis, and differs in wing markings.

H. a. shirakii is assessed as Near Threatened on the Japanese Ministry of the Environment Red List. When the Ministry designated H. assimilis as a Specified Invasive Alien Species with effect from 15 January 2018, H. a. shirakii was explicitly excluded from the designation, so that the endemic Amami population remains legally protected rather than regulated. A stated rationale for listing the species as a whole was the risk that released continental stock could reach the Amami Islands and genetically swamp the endemic subspecies.

== Description ==
Adults have a forewing length of 40–53 mm, and females lay on the order of 200 eggs.

=== Seasonal forms ===
H. assimilis is seasonally polyphenic. Summer-generation adults have red submarginal spots on the hindwing, while spring-generation adults lack the red spots and are substantially paler, with reduced black scaling — an appearance most pronounced in females. This pale phenotype corresponds to the form long known as nigrivena.

Laboratory work on the Kanagawa population showed that the white morph is induced by both short photoperiod and relatively cool temperatures acting together: rearing at 15 °C produced white morphs, whereas 20 °C or 25 °C produced black-veined summer morphs. The temperature-sensitive period fell mainly in the third and fourth larval instars, particularly the fourth, and white morph production was closely associated with markedly delayed larval development. Cool temperature alone was sufficient to produce white morphs even without an intervening larval diapause.

== Range ==
In Kanagawa

H. assimilis is found from eastern Tibet to most of China, in Hong Kong and in Korea. Its natural range comprises northern Vietnam, southern and eastern continental China, the Korean Peninsula and peripheral islands such as Jeju, together with the Amami Islands of Japan and Taiwan, where separate subspecies occur.

== Behaviour ==
H. assimilis often uses its long proboscis to probe in muddy soil or gravel to get the moisture it needs. The male is strongly territorial, always staying in high positions to defend its territory.

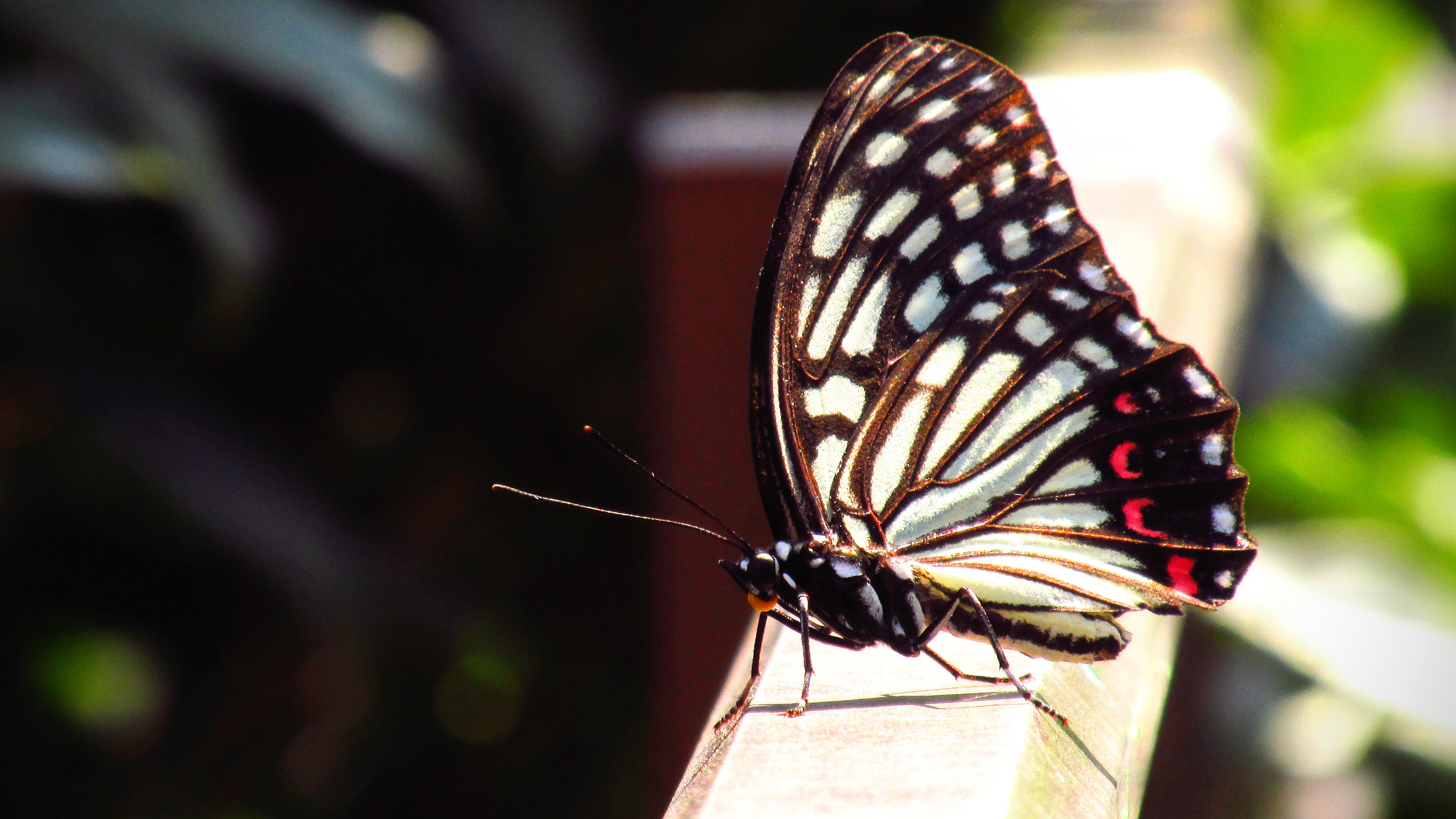
In a residential area in midwestern Saitama, Japan, 2019.

== Introduced population in Japan ==
The nominate subspecies H. a. assimilis is established in central Honshu as a non-native species. A transient occurrence was recorded in Saitama Prefecture in 1995, and breeding and establishment were confirmed in Kanagawa Prefecture in 1998. The population subsequently reached Izu Ōshima (2009) and Ibaraki Prefecture (2011), and now occupies most of the Kantō region, with further records from Shizuoka, Aichi, Gifu, Ishikawa and Yamanashi prefectures.

Because the Kantō population is geographically isolated from the natural range and appeared abruptly, and because its wing pattern matches the continental nominate subspecies rather than the Amami endemic, it is generally attributed to deliberate unauthorised release by butterfly enthusiasts rather than to natural range expansion.

The species was designated a Specified Invasive Alien Species under Japan's invasive species legislation with effect from 15 January 2018 (excluding H. a. shirakii), making keeping, transport, sale and release illegal without a permit.

=== Ecological concerns ===
Concern centres on competition with native butterflies whose larvae also use Celtis sinensis, including the Japanese emperor, the closely related Hestina japonica and the nettle-tree butterfly. Hybrids between H. a. assimilis and H. japonica have been produced experimentally, but the low rate of successful adult eclosion suggests limited risk of introgression in the wild.

Field surveys in Chiba, Saitama and Aichi prefectures between 2019 and 2023 found that H. a. assimilis completes three generations per year in the Kantō region, with a partial fourth generation producing the overwintering larvae; fifth-instar larvae occurred in April, June, August and September–October, and adults emerged 16–38 days after moulting to the fifth instar. The same study found that its larvae preferred young host trees, in contrast to native H. japonica, suggesting the two species partition the shared host plant spatially rather than competing directly.

Rearing experiments comparing post-diapause larvae of the two species found that H. a. assimilis resumed development at a slightly lower temperature — from about 12 °C, with wide variation between individuals — than H. japonica, which resumed from about 14 °C.

Habitat suitability modelling based on specimen records from the native range and the distribution of Celtis host plants has been used to estimate the extent of potentially colonisable habitat in Japan.

== Genome ==
A chromosome-level genome assembly of H. assimilis was published in 2023. The assembly is 412.82 Mb with a scaffold N50 of 15.70 Mb, and 98.11% of contigs were anchored to 30 chromosomes; 16,120 protein-coding genes were annotated. Synteny and Hi-C analyses indicated a Z–autosome fusion.

The genome shows an expansion of cytochrome P450 detoxification genes — 80 in total, with the CYP4 clan significantly expanded — alongside a marked contraction of chemoreception gene families relative to the nectar-feeding monarch butterfly (Danaus plexippus): 33 olfactory receptors, 20 odorant-binding proteins and 6 gustatory receptors, against 57, 32 and 29 respectively. Bitter receptors outnumbered sugar receptors, consistent with a diet of fermenting substrates.
