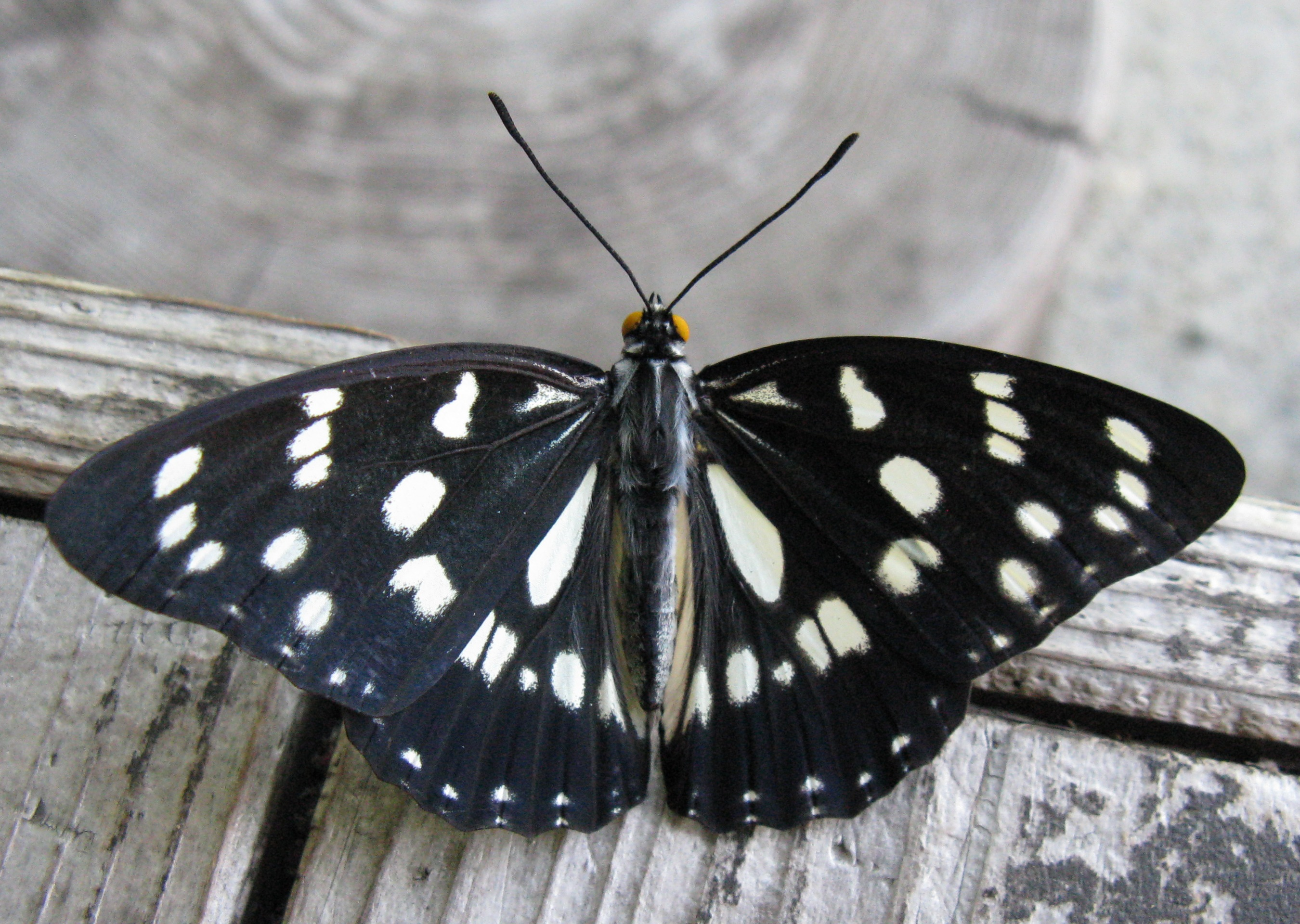

Scientific classification
- Domain: Eukaryota
- Kingdom: Animalia
- Phylum: Arthropoda
- Class: Insecta
- Order: Lepidoptera
- Family: Nymphalidae
- Genus: Hestina
- Species: H. japonica

Binomial name
- Hestina japonica (C. & R. Felder, 1862)

Synonyms
- Apatura japonica C. & R. Felder, 1862; Diadema diagoras Hewitson, 1863

= Hestina japonica =

Species of butterfly

Hestina japonica is an East Palearctic species of siren butterfly found in Japan (H. j. japonica) and Korea ( H. j. seoki).

== Subspecies ==
- Hestina japonica japonica Japan
- Hestina japonica seoki Shirôzu, 1955 (Korea)
