= HMAS Medea =

1912 auxiliary minesweeper

History

Singapore
- Name: Circe
- Namesake: the goddess of magic Circe
- Owner: Ocean Steam Ship Co. (1912-1925); Straits Steam Ship Co. (1925-1939)
- Operator: Blue Funnel Line
- Builder: Taikoo Dockyard & Engineering Company, Hong Kong
- Launched: 1912
- Fate: Requisitioned by Royal Navy in 1939

United Kingdom
- Name: Circe
- In service: 1939
- Out of service: 1942
- Fate: Transferred to Royal Australian Navy in 1942

Australia
- Name: Medea
- Namesake: the mythological Medea
- In service: 1942
- Out of service: 1946
- Fate: Returned to owners in 1946, later scuttled off Sydney on 20 January 1948

General characteristics
- Tonnage: 778 gross register tons
- Length: 195 ft 8 in (59.64 m)
- Beam: 31 ft 7 in (9.63 m)
- Speed: 10 knots (19 km/h; 12 mph)

HMAS Medea was an auxiliary minesweeper of the Royal Australian Navy (RAN) between 1942 until 1946. Built in 1912 for the Ocean Steam Ship Co. she was sold to the Straits Steam Ship Co. in 1925. She was requisitioned by the Royal Navy in 1939 and converted into an auxiliary minesweeper and named HMS Circe. She was transferred to the Royal Australian Navy in 1942 and renamed HMAS Medea until she was returned to her owners in 1946. She was sold and was scuttled off Sydney on 20 January 1948.

== Construction and design ==
Built in 1912 by Taikoo Dockyard & Engineering Co., Hong Kong as a passenger cargo vessel for the Ocean Steam Ship Co. based at Singapore.

== Operational service ==
She plied the Singapore straits as part of the Blue Funnel Line until she was requisitioned in 1939 by the Royal Navy and conversion into an auxiliary minesweeper and commissioned as HMS Circe. She was transferred to the Royal Australian Navy in 1942 and renamed HMAS Medea upon commissioning on 6 July 1942.

== Fate ==
She was returned to her owners in 1946 and was sold for breaking up at Drummoyne, Sydney. Her hull was scuttled off Sydney on 20 January 1948. 33.998267°S 151.601139°E
