= Ferhat Çerçi =

German footballer and manager

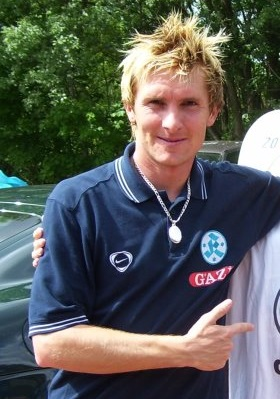

Personal information
- Date of birth: 2 September 1981 (age 45)
- Place of birth: Hamm, West Germany
- Height: 1.73 m (5 ft 8 in)
- Positions: Midfielder; striker

Team information
- Current team: Hammer SpVg II (manager)

Senior career*
Years	Team	Apps	(Gls)
–2001	Hammer SpVg		
2001–2003	LR Ahlen	4	(0)
2003–2004	SV Lippstadt 08		
2004–2005	Arminia Bielefeld II	22	(5)
2004–2005	Arminia Bielefeld	1	(0)
2005–2007	Kickers Emden	42	(11)
2007	Kocaelispor		
2008	Stuttgarter Kickers	15	(1)
2008–2010	Eyüpspor	32	(6)
2009–2010	→ Tarsus Idman Yurdu (loan)	9	(1)
2011–2014	Hammer SpVg		

Managerial career
- 2014–: Hammer SpVg II
- 2015: Hammer SpVg (caretaker)
- * Club domestic league appearances and goals

Ferhat Çerçi (born 2 September 1981 in Hamm) is a German football manager and former football player. He played for Hammer SpVg. He also holds Turkish citizenship. He spent one season in the Bundesliga with Arminia Bielefeld.

He is currently the manager of Hammer SpVg II.
