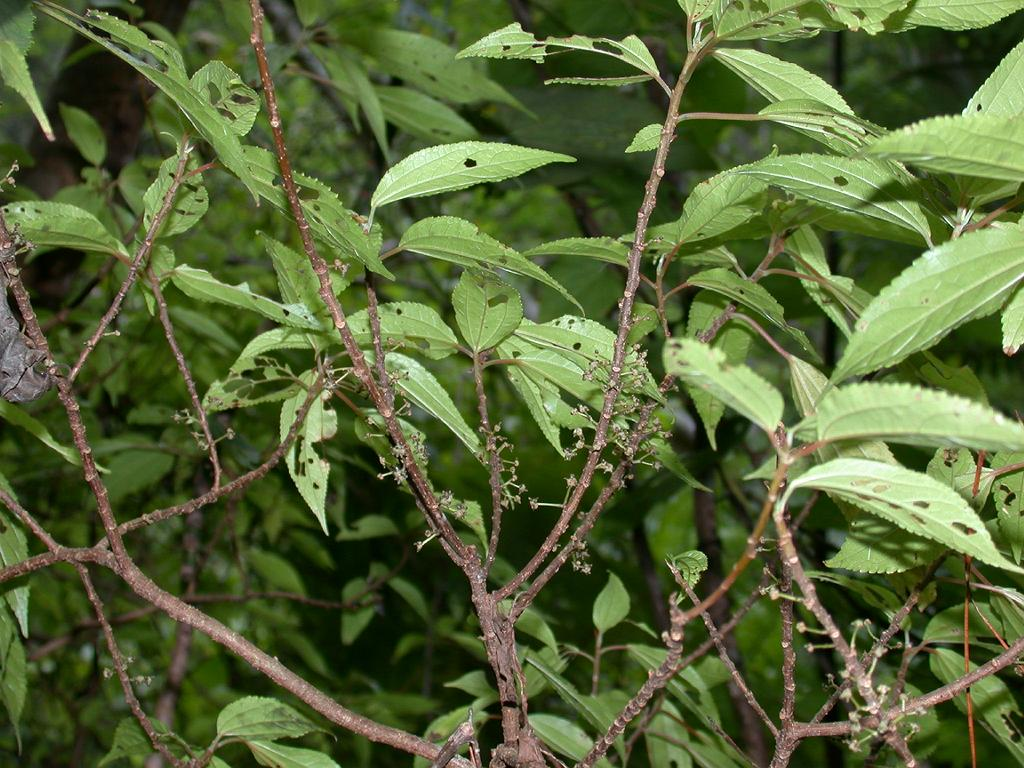
- Oreocnide pedunculata

Scientific classification
- Kingdom: Plantae
- Clade: Tracheophytes
- Clade: Angiosperms
- Clade: Eudicots
- Clade: Rosids
- Order: Rosales
- Family: Urticaceae
- Tribe: Boehmerieae
- Genus: Oreocnide; Miq.

= Oreocnide =

Genus of plants

Oreocnide is a genus of flowering plants belonging to the family Urticaceae.

Its native range is Tropical and Subtropical Asia.

== Species ==
Species:

- Oreocnide boniana (Gagnep.) Hand.-Mazz.
- Oreocnide frutescens (Thunb.) Miq.
- Oreocnide integrifolia (Gaudich.) Miq.
- Oreocnide × intermedia (Hatus.) Tateishi
- Oreocnide kwangsiensis Hand.-Mazz.
- Oreocnide murina (Blume) Miq.
- Oreocnide nivea Merr.
- Oreocnide obovata (C.H.Wright) Merr.
- Oreocnide pedunculata (Shirai) Masam.
- Oreocnide rhodopleura (Blume) Miq.
- Oreocnide rubescens (Blume) Miq.
- Oreocnide rufescens (Blume) Miq.
- Oreocnide semicrenata (Blume) Miq.
- Oreocnide serrulata C.J.Chen
- Oreocnide tonkinensis (Gagnep.) Merr. & Chun
- Oreocnide trinervis (Wedd.) Miq.
