= French submarine Calypso (1907) =

Submarine

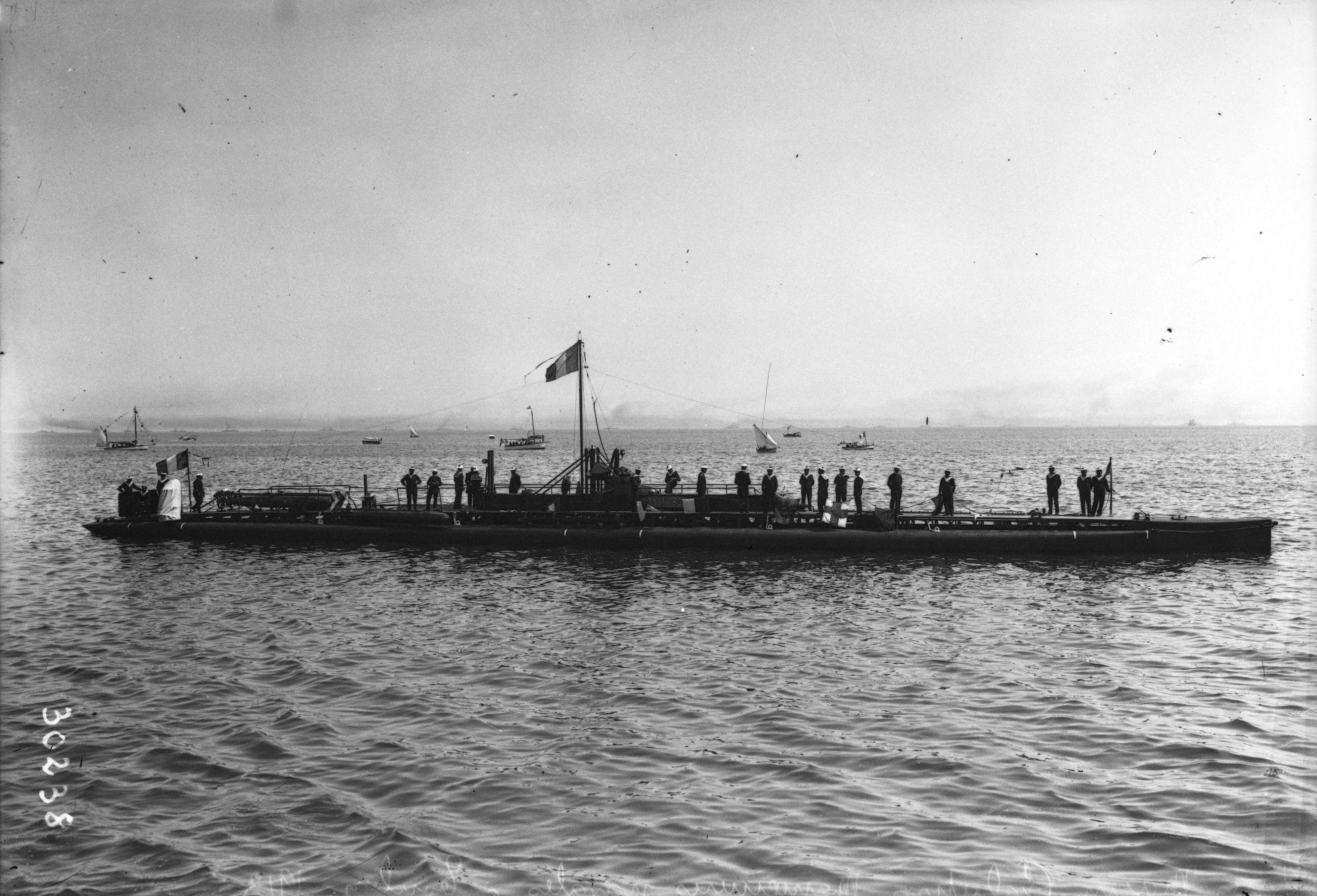

History

France
- Name: Calypso
- Namesake: Calypso
- Builder: Arsenal de Toulon
- Laid down: 1905
- Launched: 24 October 1907
- Completed: 5 August 1909
- Identification: Pennant number: Q48
- Fate: Sunk in a collision, 7 July 1914

General characteristics (as built)
- Class & type: Circé-class submarine
- Displacement: 361 t (355 long tons) (surfaced); 498 t (490 long tons) (submerged)
- Length: 47.13 m (154 ft 8 in) (o/a)
- Beam: 4.9 m (16 ft 1 in)
- Draft: 3.24 m (10 ft 8 in)
- Installed power: 630 PS (463 kW; 621 bhp) (diesels); 360 PS (265 kW; 355 bhp) (electric motors)
- Propulsion: 2 × shafts; 2 × diesel engines; 2 × electric motors
- Speed: 11.9 knots (22.0 km/h; 13.7 mph) (surfaced, trials); 7.3–7.7 knots (13.5–14.3 km/h; 8.4–8.9 mph) (submerged, trials)
- Range: 2,000 nmi (3,700 km; 2,300 mi) at 7.3 knots (13.5 km/h; 8.4 mph) (surfaced); 76 nmi (141 km; 87 mi) at 4 knots (7.4 km/h; 4.6 mph) (submerged)
- Complement: 2 officers and 20 crewmen
- Armament: 6 × external 450 mm (17.7 in) torpedo launchers (4 × fixed, 2 × Drzewiecki drop collars)

Calypso was one of two Circé-class submarines built for the French Navy (Marine Nationale) in the first decade of the 20th century.

== Design and description ==
The Circé class were built as part of the French Navy's 1904 building program to a double-hull design by Maxime Laubeuf. The submarines displaced 361 metric tons (355 long tons) surfaced and 498 metric tons (490 long tons) submerged. They had an overall length of 47.13 meters (154 ft 8 in), a beam of 4.9 meters (16 ft 1 in), and a draft of 3.24 meters (10 ft 8 in). Their crew numbered 2 officers and 20 enlisted men.

For surface running, the boats were powered by two German MAN 315-metric-horsepower (311 bhp; 232 kW) diesel engines, each driving one propeller shaft. When submerged each propeller was driven by a 180-metric-horsepower (178 bhp; 132 kW) electric motor. During her surfaced sea trials on 19 February 1909, Calypso reached a maximum speed of 11.9 knots (22.0 km/h; 13.7 mph) from 968 metric horsepower (955 bhp; 712 kW); during her submerged trials on 27 July she reached 7.3 knots (13.5 km/h; 8.4 mph) from 390 metric horsepower (380 shp; 290 kW). The Circé class had a surface endurance of 2,000 nautical miles (3,700 km; 2,300 mi) at 7.3 knots (13.5 km/h; 8.4 mph) and a submerged endurance of 76 nmi (141 km; 87 mi) at 4 knots (7.4 km/h; 4.6 mph).

== Construction and career ==
The Circé-class submarines were ordered on 8 October 1904. Calypso was laid down in 1905 at the Arsenal de Toulon, launched on 24 October 1907 and commissioned on 5 August 1909.

== Bibliography ==
- Couhat, Jean Labayle (1974). French Warships of World War I. London: Ian Allan. ISBN 0-7110-0445-5.
- Gardiner, Robert & Gray, Randal (1985). Conway's All The World's Fighting Ships 1906–1921. London: Conway Maritime Press. ISBN 0-85177-245-5.
- Garier, Gérard (2002). A l'épreuve de la Grande Guerre. L'odyssée technique et humaine du sous-marin en France (in French). Vol. 3–2. Bourg-en-Bresse, France: Marines édition. ISBN 2-909675-81-5.
- Garier, Gérard (1998). Des Émeraude (1905-1906) au Charles Brun (1908–1933). L'odyssée technique et humaine du sous-marin en France (in French). Vol. 2. Bourg-en-Bresse, France: Marines édition. ISBN 2-909675-34-3.
