= French submarine Circé (1907) =

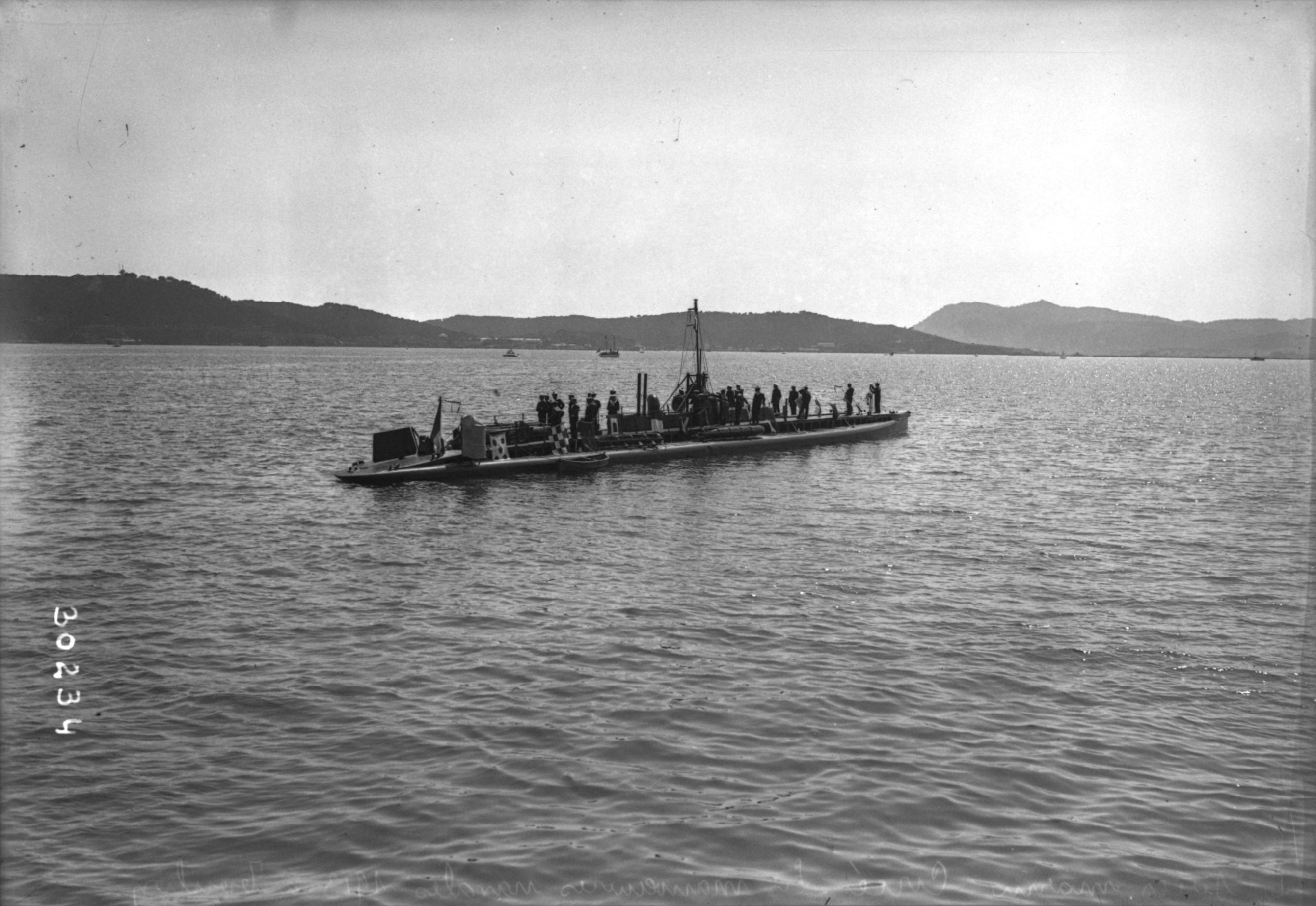
- 1913 photograph of Circé

History

France
- Name: Circé
- Namesake: Circe
- Builder: Arsenal de Toulon
- Laid down: 1905
- Launched: 13 September 1907
- Completed: 1 August 1909
- Identification: Pennant number: Q47
- Fate: Sunk, 20 September 1918

General characteristics as built
- Class & type: Circé-class submarine
- Displacement: 361 t (355 long tons) (surfaced); 498 t (490 long tons) (submerged)
- Length: 47.13 m (154 ft 8 in) (o/a)
- Beam: 4.9 m (16 ft 1 in)
- Draft: 3.24 m (10 ft 8 in)
- Installed power: 630 PS (463 kW; 621 bhp) (diesels); 360 PS (265 kW; 355 bhp) (electric motors)
- Propulsion: 2 × shafts; 2 × diesel engines; 2 × electric motors
- Speed: 11.9 knots (22.0 km/h; 13.7 mph) (surfaced, trials); 7.3–7.7 knots (13.5–14.3 km/h; 8.4–8.9 mph) (submerged, trials)
- Range: 2,000 nmi (3,700 km; 2,300 mi) at 7.3 knots (13.5 km/h; 8.4 mph) (surfaced); 76 nmi (141 km; 87 mi) at 4 knots (7.4 km/h; 4.6 mph) (submerged)
- Complement: 2 officers and 20 crewmen
- Armament: 6 × external 450 mm (17.7 in) torpedo launchers (4 × fixed, 2 × Drzewiecki drop collars)

Circé was the lead boat of her class of two submarines built for the French Navy (Marine Nationale) in the first decade of the 20th century.

== Design and description ==
The Circé class were built as part of the French Navy's 1904 building program to a double-hull design by Maxime Laubeuf. The submarines displaced 361 metric tons (355 long tons) surfaced and 498 metric tons (490 long tons) submerged. They had an overall length of 47.13 meters (154 ft 8 in), a beam of 4.9 meters (16 ft 1 in), and a draft of 3.24 meters (10 ft 8 in). Their crew numbered 2 officers and 20 enlisted men.

For surface running, the boats were powered by two German MAN 315-metric-horsepower (311 bhp; 232 kW) diesel engines, each driving one propeller shaft. When submerged each propeller was driven by a 180-metric-horsepower (178 bhp; 132 kW) electric motor. During her surfaced sea trials on 19 September 1908, Circé reached a maximum speed of 11.9 knots (22.0 km/h; 13.7 mph) from 901 metric horsepower (889 bhp; 663 kW); during her submerged trials on 25 June 1909 she reached 7.7 knots (14.3 km/h; 8.9 mph) from 394 metric horsepower (389 shp; 290 kW). The Circé class had a surface endurance of 2,000 nautical miles (3,700 km; 2,300 mi) at 7.3 knots (13.5 km/h; 8.4 mph) and a submerged endurance of 76 nmi (141 km; 87 mi) at 4 knots (7.4 km/h; 4.6 mph).

The boats were armed with six external 450-millimeter (17.7 in) torpedo launchers; four of these were fixed outwards at an angle of five degrees, two firing forward and two firing to the rear. The aft tubes were reversed in March 1911 so they too fired forward. The other launchers were a rotating pair of Drzewiecki drop collars in a single mount positioned on top of the hull at the stern. They could traverse 150 degrees to each side of the boat. A support for a 37-millimeter (1.5 in) deck gun was ordered to be installed on 29 March 1911, but the gun itself was never fitted.

== Construction and career ==
The Circé-class submarines were ordered on 8 October 1904. Calypso was laid down in 1905 at the Arsenal de Toulon, launched on 13 September 1907 and commissioned on 1 August 1909.

=== World War I ===
On 29 April 1915, Circé made several attempts to penetrate the harbour of Cattaro. Finally she gained entrance, but found no targets and had to retire. On 31 March 1917 in the Adriatic Sea, she launched a torpedo towards the German submarine SM UC-35, but missed.

On 24 May 1917, under command of Lieutenant Hélion De Cambourg, she succeeded in sinking the German submarine SM UC-24. This was one of the few sinkings by a French submarine during World War I.

On 20 September 1918, Circé under command of Lt. Henri Viaud was on anti-submarine patrol in the Southern Adriatic Sea, off Cattaro, when she was torpedoed by the Austro-Hungarian Navy submarine SM U-47 at 04:00, while recharging her batteries. Only one survivor was rescued.

== Bibliography ==
- Couhat, Jean Labayle (1974). French Warships of World War I. London: Ian Allan. ISBN 0-7110-0445-5.
- Garier, Gérard (2002). A l'épreuve de la Grande Guerre. L'odyssée technique et humaine du sous-marin en France (in French). Vol. 3–2. Bourg-en-Bresse, France: Marines édition. ISBN 2-909675-81-5.
- Garier, Gérard (1998). Des Émeraude (1905–1906) au Charles Brun (1908–1933). L'odyssée technique et humaine du sous-marin en France (in French). Vol. 2. Bourg-en-Bresse, France: Marines édition. ISBN 2-909675-34-3.
- Smigielski, Adam (1985). "France". In Gray, Randal (ed.). Conway's All the World's Fighting Ships 1906–1921. Annapolis, Maryland: Naval Institute Press. pp. 190–220. ISBN 0-87021-907-3.
