= USS Circe =

Two ships of the United States Navy have been named Circe, after Circe, the sorceress in Homer's Odyssey.

- USS Circe only carried that name from 15 June to 10 August 1869 and was previously the Marietta.
- USS Circe (AKA-25) was launched on 4 August 1944 by the Walsh-Kaiser Company in Providence, Rhode Island.
