= Guêpe-class submarine =

Class overview
- Name: Guêpe class
- Operators: French Navy
- Preceded by: Circé class
- Succeeded by: Ariane class
- Built: 1906
- Planned: 10
- Completed: 0
- Canceled: 10

General characteristics
- Type: Submarine
- Displacement: 44 tons (surfaced)
- Length: 20.5 m (67 ft 3 in)
- Beam: 2.1 m (6 ft 11 in)
- Propulsion: 1 Schneider diesel engine, 1 shaft
- Speed: 10.5 knots (19.4 km/h; 12.1 mph) (surfaced); 9 knots (17 km/h; 10 mph) (submerged)
- Range: 128 nmi (237 km; 147 mi) at 10.5 knots (19.4 km/h; 12.1 mph) (surfaced); 80 nmi (150 km; 92 mi) at 6 knots (11 km/h; 6.9 mph) (submerged)
- Test depth: 20 m (65 ft 7 in)
- Complement: 7
- Armament: 2 × 450 mm (17.7 in) Drzewiecki drop collar torpedo launchers

The Guêpe-class submarines were a planned class of submarines to be built for the French Navy ordered in 1904. Ten of the class were projected but only two were laid down before the whole project was cancelled. Construction of the two vessels that were laid down began in 1906, but it was stopped in 1908 before they could be completed.

== Construction and specifications ==
The Guêpe-class submarines, designed by Emmanuel Petithomme and built under French Minister of Marine Camille Pelletan's ministry, were solely intended for use in harbor defense. Although ten were projected, only two of the class were laid down in Cherbourg. Neither of these were completed before Camille Pelletan was replaced as Minister of Marine and his successor cancelled their construction. The class-name, "guêpe", is French for wasp.

With a single-hull design, the Guêpe-class submarines were planned to have a surfaced displacement of 44 tons, and were 20.5 metres (67 ft 3 in) in length, with a beam of 2.1 metres (6 ft 11 in). If built, the Guêpe submarines would have been powered by one Schneider diesel engine driving a single shaft, which would have provided a top speed of 10.5 knots (19.4 km/h; 12.1 mph) when surfaced and 9 knots (17 km/h; 10 mph) when submerged. Each vessel would have had a range of 128 nautical miles (237 km; 147 mi) at 10.5 knots (19.4 km/h; 12.1 mph), while surfaced, and 80 nmi (150 km; 92 mi) at 6 knots (11 km/h; 6.9 mph) when submerged, and had a crew of seven. Guêpe-class submarines had a maximum depth of 20 m (65 ft 7 in). The vessels' armament would have consisted solely of two 450 mm (17.7 in) Drzewiecki drop collar torpedo launchers.

== Boats ==
Ordered in 1904, Guêpe 1 and Guêpe 2 were laid down in 1906 at the Cherbourg Naval Base. Eight more boats, Guêpe 3 to 10, were planned to be built in Cherbourg, Rochefort, and Brest. Only the first two submarines were ordered on 8 October 1904 and laid down. Construction stopped in March 1908. The pennant numbers Q 51 to 58, reserved for Guêpe 3 to Guêpe 10, were assigned the following year to Pluviôse-class submarines.

Guêpe-class submarines
Name	Ordered	Laid down	Fate
Guêpe 1	1904	1906	Construction stopped in 1908
Guêpe 2	1904	1906	Construction stopped in 1908
Guêpe 3	1904		Cancelled in 1908
Guêpe 4	1904		Cancelled in 1908
Guêpe 5	1904		Cancelled in 1908
Guêpe 6	1904		Cancelled in 1908
Guêpe 7	1904		Cancelled in 1908
Guêpe 8	1904		Cancelled in 1908
Guêpe 9	1904		Cancelled in 1908
Guêpe 10	1904		Cancelled in 1908

== See also ==
- List of submarines of France
