= Circé-class submarine (1907) =

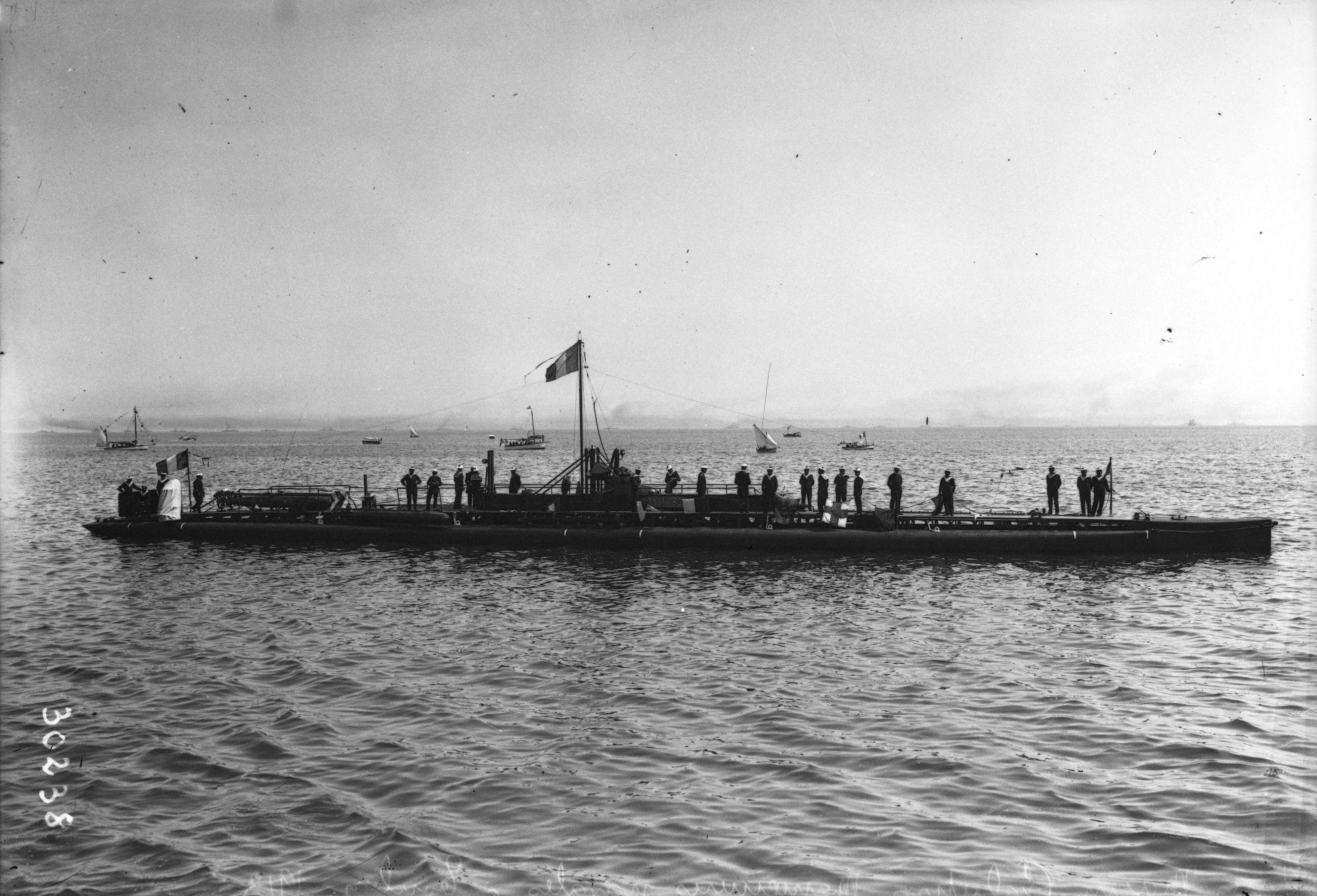

Class overview
- Name: Circé class
- Builders: Arsenal de Toulon
- Operators: French Navy
- Preceded by: Émeraude class
- Succeeded by: Guêpe class
- Built: 1905–1909
- In commission: 1909–1918
- Completed: 2
- Lost: 2

General characteristics (as built)
- Type: Submarine
- Displacement: 361 t (355 long tons) (surfaced); 498 t (490 long tons) (submerged)
- Length: 47.13 m (154 ft 8 in) (o/a)
- Beam: 4.9 m (16 ft 1 in)
- Draft: 3.24 m (10 ft 8 in)
- Installed power: 630 PS (463 kW; 621 bhp) (diesels); 360 PS (265 kW; 355 bhp) (electric motors)
- Propulsion: 2 × shafts; 2 × diesel engines; 2 × electric motors
- Speed: 11.9 knots (22.0 km/h; 13.7 mph) (surfaced, trials); 7.3–7.7 knots (13.5–14.3 km/h; 8.4–8.9 mph) (submerged, trials)
- Range: 2,000 nmi (3,700 km; 2,300 mi) at 7.3 knots (13.5 km/h; 8.4 mph) (surfaced); 76 nmi (141 km; 87 mi) at 4 knots (7.4 km/h; 4.6 mph) (submerged)
- Complement: 2 officers and 20 crewmen
- Armament: 6 × external 450 mm (17.7 in) torpedo launchers (4 × fixed, 2 × Drzewiecki drop collars)

The Circé-class submarines consisted of a pair of submarines built for the French Navy (Marine Nationale) during the first decade of the 20th century. One boat was sunk in a collision before the First World War and the other was torpedoed and sunk by a German submarine in the last year of the war.

== Design and description ==
The Circé class were built as part of the French Navy's 1904 building program to a double-hull design by Maxime Laubeuf. The submarines displaced 361 metric tons (355 long tons) surfaced and 498 metric tons (490 long tons) submerged. They had an overall length of 47.13 meters (154 ft 8 in), a beam of 4.9 meters (16 ft 1 in), and a draft of 3.24 meters (10 ft 8 in). Their crew numbered 2 officers and 20 enlisted men.

For surface running, the boats were powered by two German MAN 315-metric-horsepower (311 bhp; 232 kW) diesel engines, each driving one propeller shaft. When submerged each propeller was driven by a 180-metric-horsepower (178 bhp; 132 kW) electric motor. During their sea trials in 1908, they reached maximum speeds of 11.9 knots (22.0 km/h; 13.7 mph) on the surface and 7.3–7.7 knots (13.5–14.3 km/h; 8.4–8.9 mph) underwater. The Circé class had a surface endurance of 2,000 nautical miles (3,700 km; 2,300 mi) at 7.3 knots (13.5 km/h; 8.4 mph) and a submerged endurance of 76 nmi (141 km; 87 mi) at 4 knots (7.4 km/h; 4.6 mph).

The boats were armed with six external 450-millimeter (17.7 in) torpedo launchers; four of these were fixed outwards at an angle of five degrees, two firing forward and two firing to the rear. The aft tubes were reversed in March 1911 so they too fired forward. The other launchers were a rotating pair of Drzewiecki drop collars in a single mount positioned on top of the hull at the stern. They could traverse 150 degrees to each side of the boat. A support for a 37-millimeter (1.5 in) deck gun was ordered to be installed on 29 March 1911, but the gun itself was never fitted.

== Ships ==
Circé-class submarines
Ship	Builder	Laid down	Launched	Commissioned	Fate
Calypso (Q48)	Arsenal de Toulon	1905	22 October 1907	5 August 1909	Sunk in a collision with Circé, 7 July 1914
Circé (Q47)	Arsenal de Toulon	1905	13 September 1907	1 August 1909	Sunk by SM U-47, 20 September 1918

== See also ==
- List of submarines of France

== Bibliography ==
- Couhat, Jean Labayle (1974). French Warships of World War I. London: Ian Allan. ISBN 0-7110-0445-5.
- Gardiner, Robert & Gray, Randal (1985). Conway's All The World's Fighting Ships 1906–1921. London: Conway Maritime Press. ISBN 0-85177-245-5.
- Garier, Gérard (2002). A l'épreuve de la Grande Guerre. L'odyssée technique et humaine du sous-marin en France (in French). Vol. 3–2. Bourg-en-Bresse, France: Marines édition. ISBN 2-909675-81-5.
- Garier, Gérard (1998). Des Émeraude (1905-1906) au Charles Brun (1908–1933). L'odyssée technique et humaine du sous-marin en France (in French). Vol. 2. Bourg-en-Bresse, France: Marines édition. ISBN 2-909675-34-3.
- Roche, Jean-Michel (2005). Dictionnaire des bâtiments de la flotte de guerre française de Colbert à nos jours 2, 1870 - 2006. Toulon: Roche. ISBN 978-2-9525917-0-6. OCLC 165892922.
