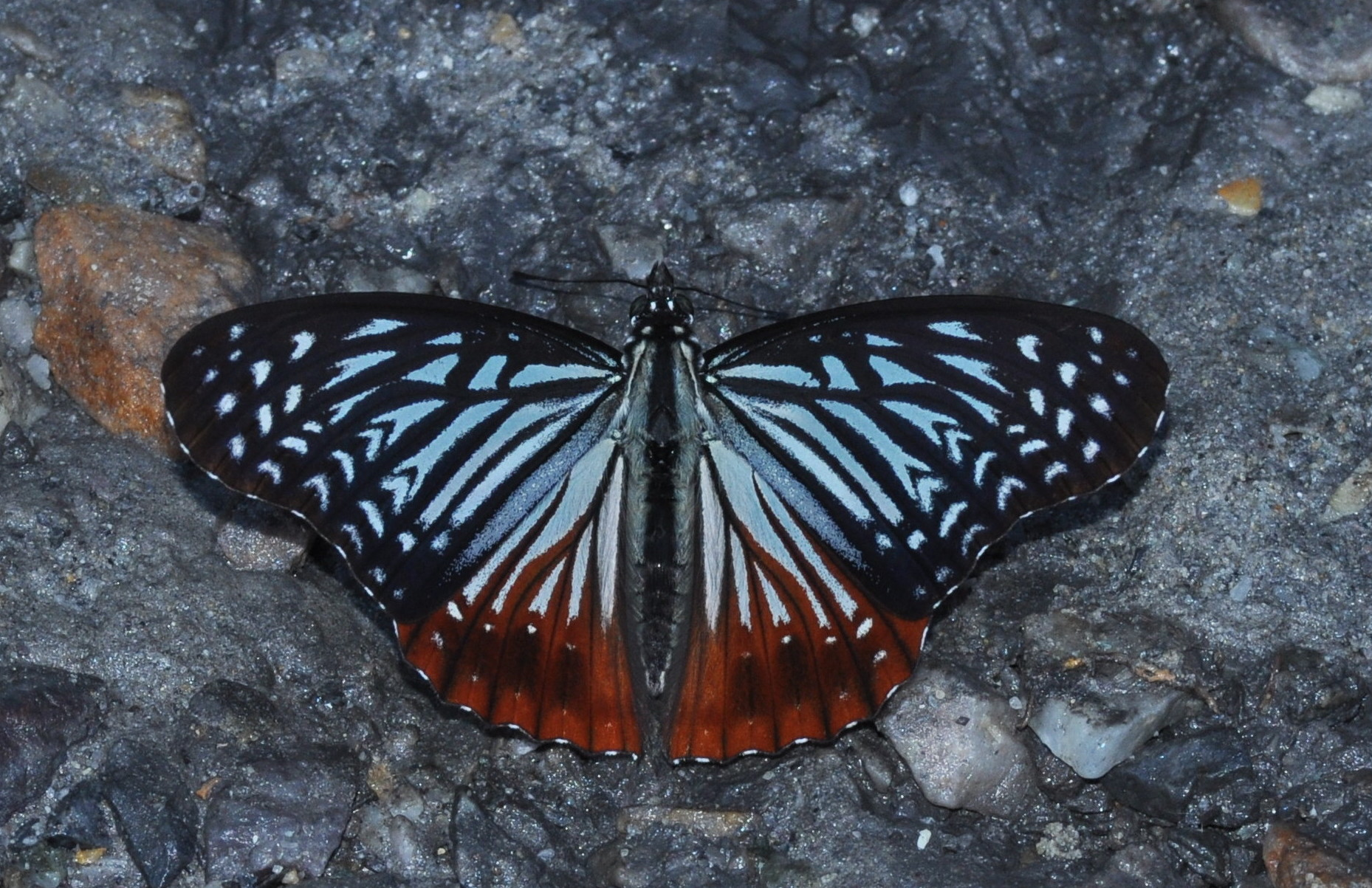
- dorsal view
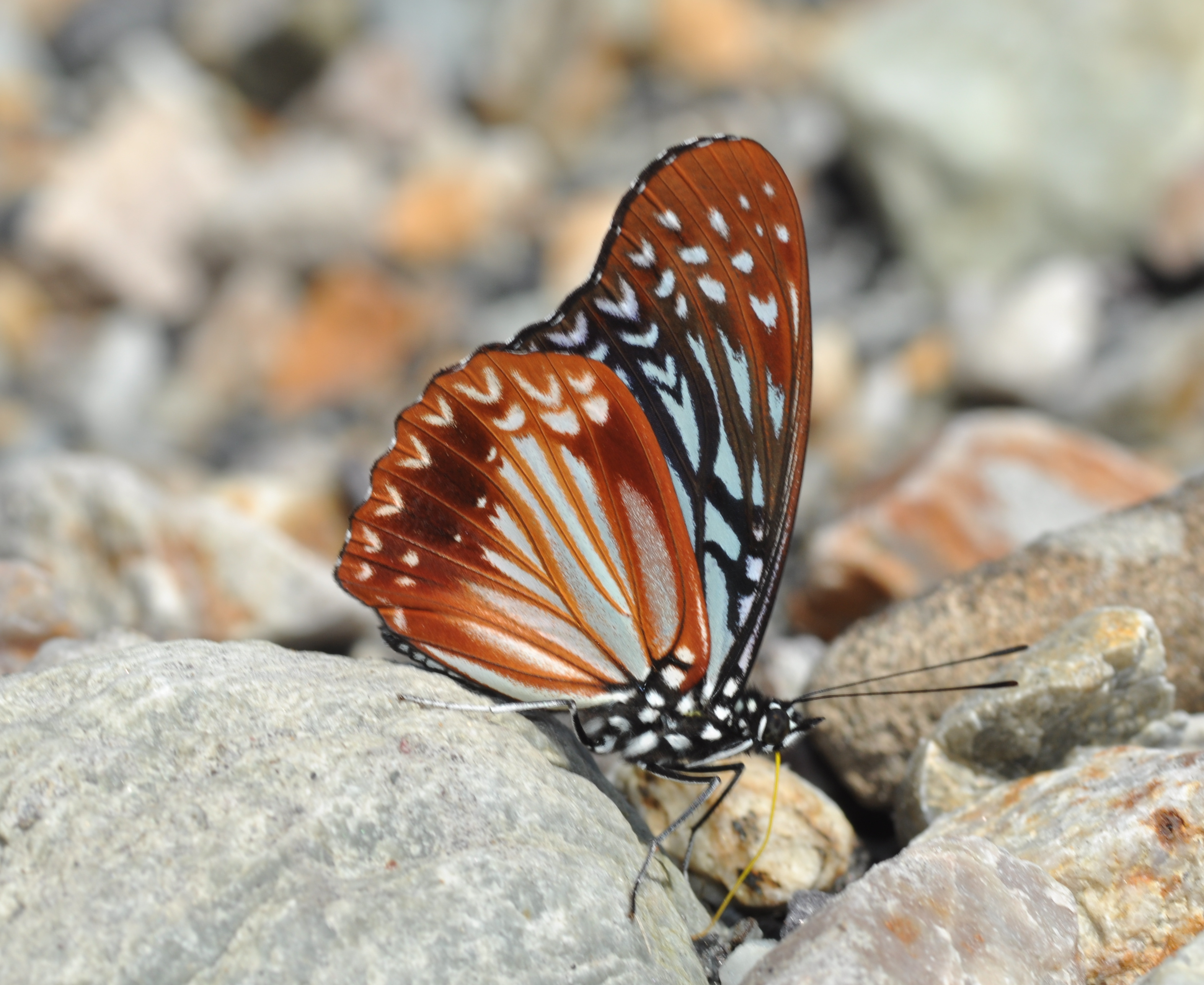
- ventral view

Scientific classification
- Kingdom: Animalia
- Phylum: Arthropoda
- Class: Insecta
- Order: Lepidoptera
- Family: Nymphalidae
- Genus: Hestina
- Species: H. nama

Binomial name
- Hestina nama (Westwood, 1850)

Synonyms
- Hestinalis nama (Westwood, 1850)

= Hestina nama =

Circe

Species of butterfly

Hestina nama, the Circe, is a species of nymphalid butterfly found in South Asia.

== See also ==
- List of butterflies of India (Nymphalidae)
