= Debregeasia saeneb =

Scientific classification
- Kingdom: Plantae
- Clade: Tracheophytes
- Clade: Angiosperms
- Clade: Eudicots
- Clade: Rosids
- Order: Rosales
- Family: Urticaceae
- Genus: Debregeasia
- Species: D. saeneb

Binomial name
- Debregeasia saeneb (Forssk.) Hepper & J.R.I.Wood

Species of flowering plant

Debregieasia saeneb, also known as ajilai, is a shrub that can reach a height of 1.5–2.4 m. It has dark reddish branchlets and dark green leaves at mature form; the upper side of leaves are green and lower side are white-grey colour. It is an evergreen plant with edible fruit that can be used as a flavouring agent. Its stems are used for fibre and fuel wood. It is found in Pakistan, the United Kingdom and Saudi Arabia. The powder form of leaves mixed with mustard oil is used for antifungal activity to curing skin rashes, dermatitis (inflammation of the skin) and eczema. The leaves of the plant are boiled in tea and used to alleviate abdominal pain.
