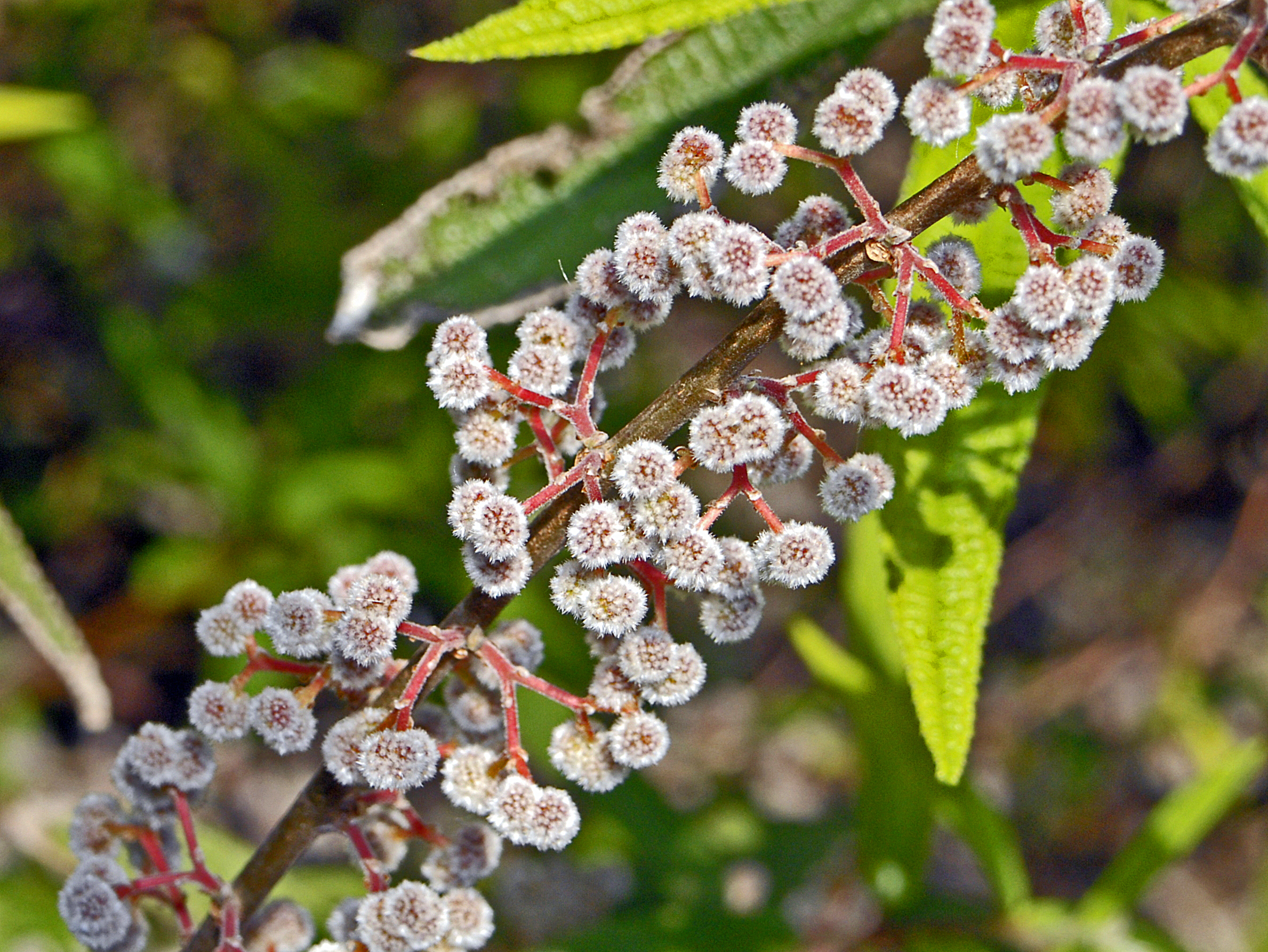
- Female flowers of Debregeasia orientalis

Scientific classification
- Kingdom: Plantae
- Clade: Tracheophytes
- Clade: Angiosperms
- Clade: Eudicots
- Clade: Rosids
- Order: Rosales
- Family: Urticaceae
- Genus: Debregeasia
- Species: D. orientalis

Binomial name
- Debregeasia orientalis C. J. Chen

Synonyms
- Debregeasia edulis Sieb. & Zucc.; Boehmeria janatsi-itsigo Sieb.; Debregeasia japonica (Miq.) Koidz.; Missiessya parvifolia Wedd.; Morocarpus edulis Sieb. & Zucc.; Morocarpus japonicus Miq.

= Debregeasia orientalis =

Species of flowering plant

Debregeasia orientalis, common name yanagi ichigo, is a large shrub belonging to the family Urticaceae.

== Description ==
Debregeasia orientalis can reach a height of 1–4 metres (3 ft 3 in – 13 ft 1 in). Branchlets are dark reddish and slender. Leaves are dark green, alternate, oblong- to linear-lanceolate, with dark reddish petioles. Inflorescences show many globose glomerules, 3–5 mm in diameter. The fruits are edible and can be used to make wine.

== Distribution ==
This species is native to Bhutan, north-eastern India, Nepal, China, Taiwan and Japan. It prefers shaded, wet places in mountain valleys, at an elevation of 300–2,800 metres (980–9,190 ft) above sea level.

== Gallery ==
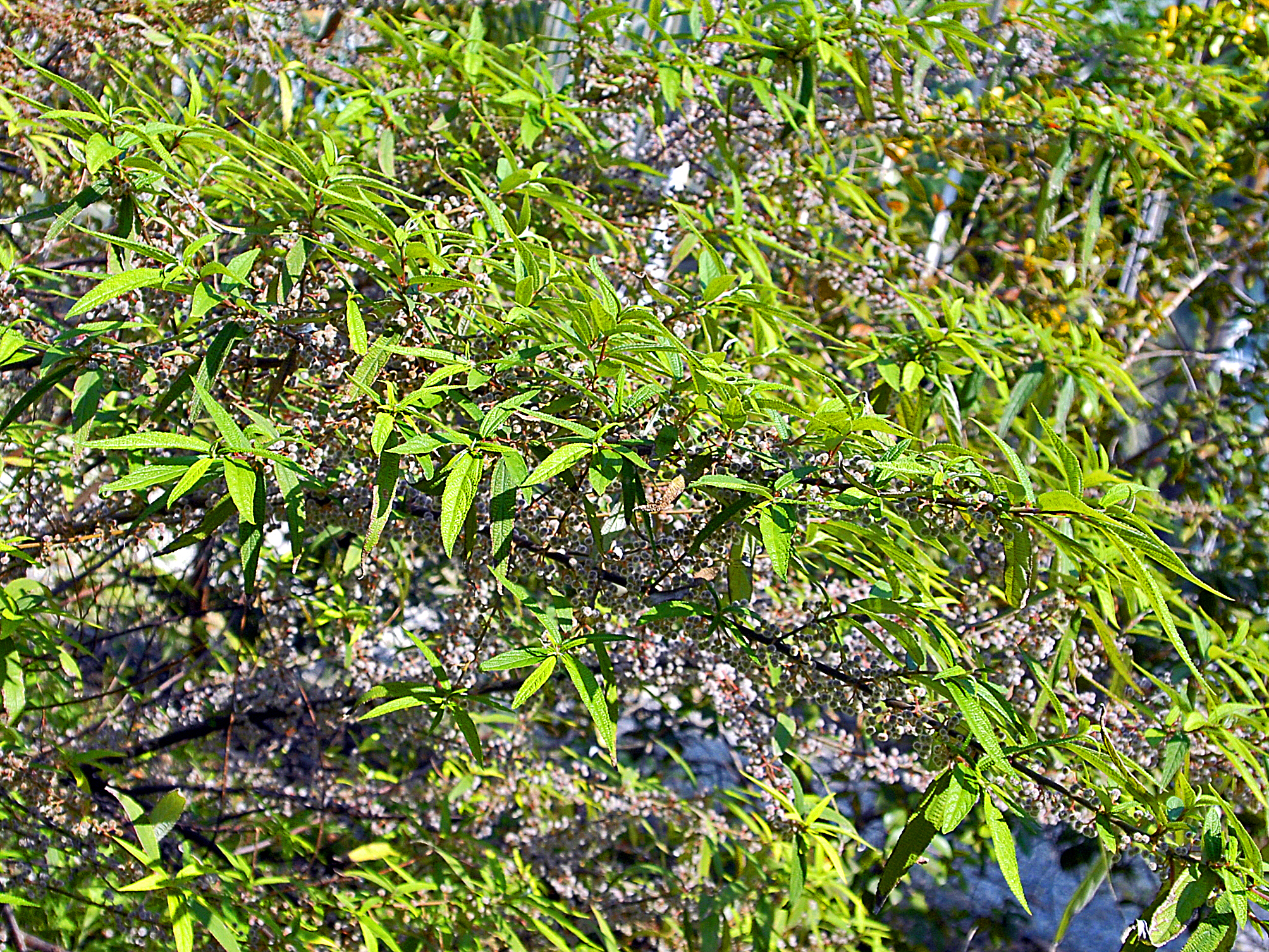
Shrub of Debregeasia orientalis

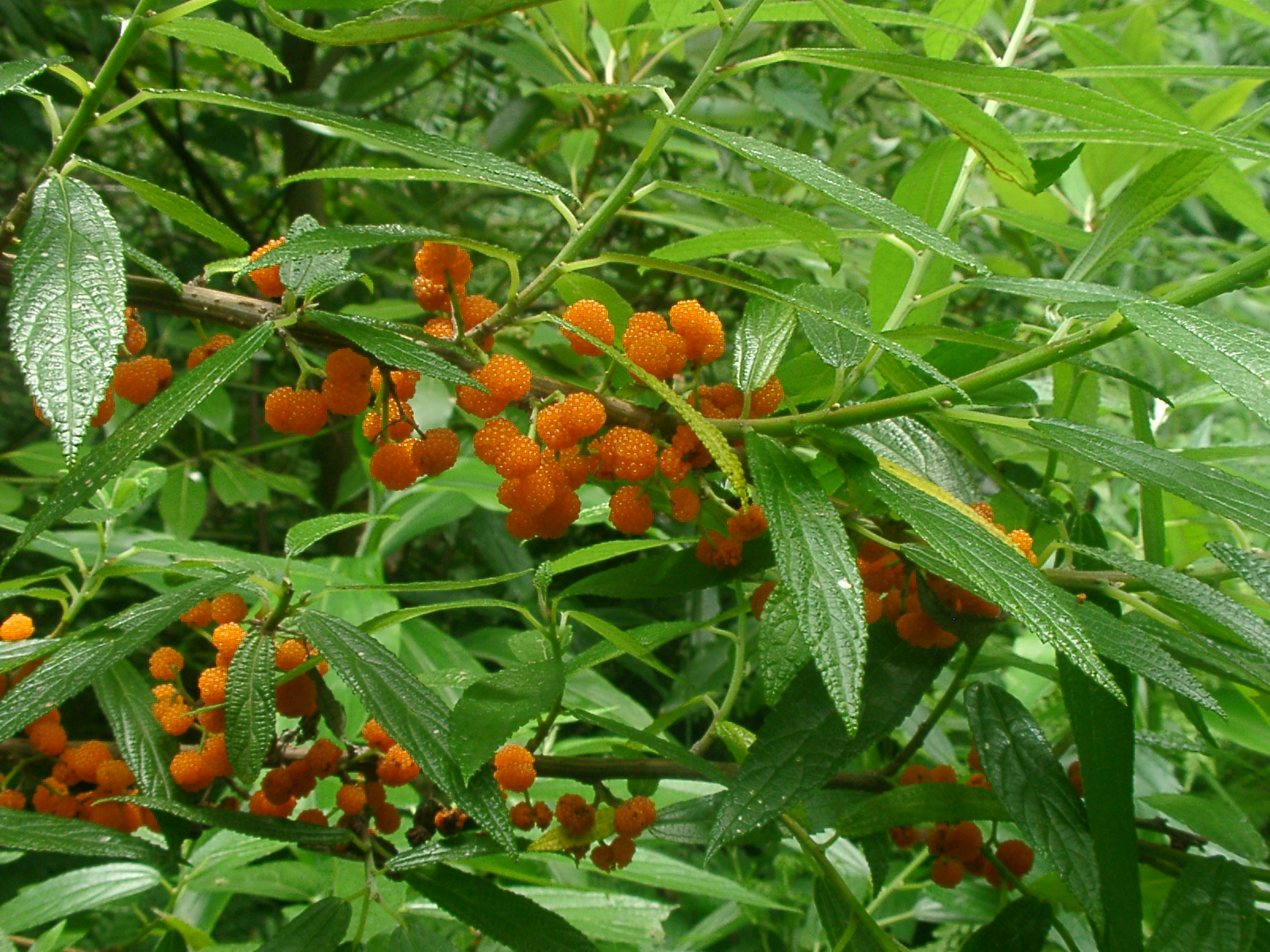
Fruits of Debregeasia orientalis

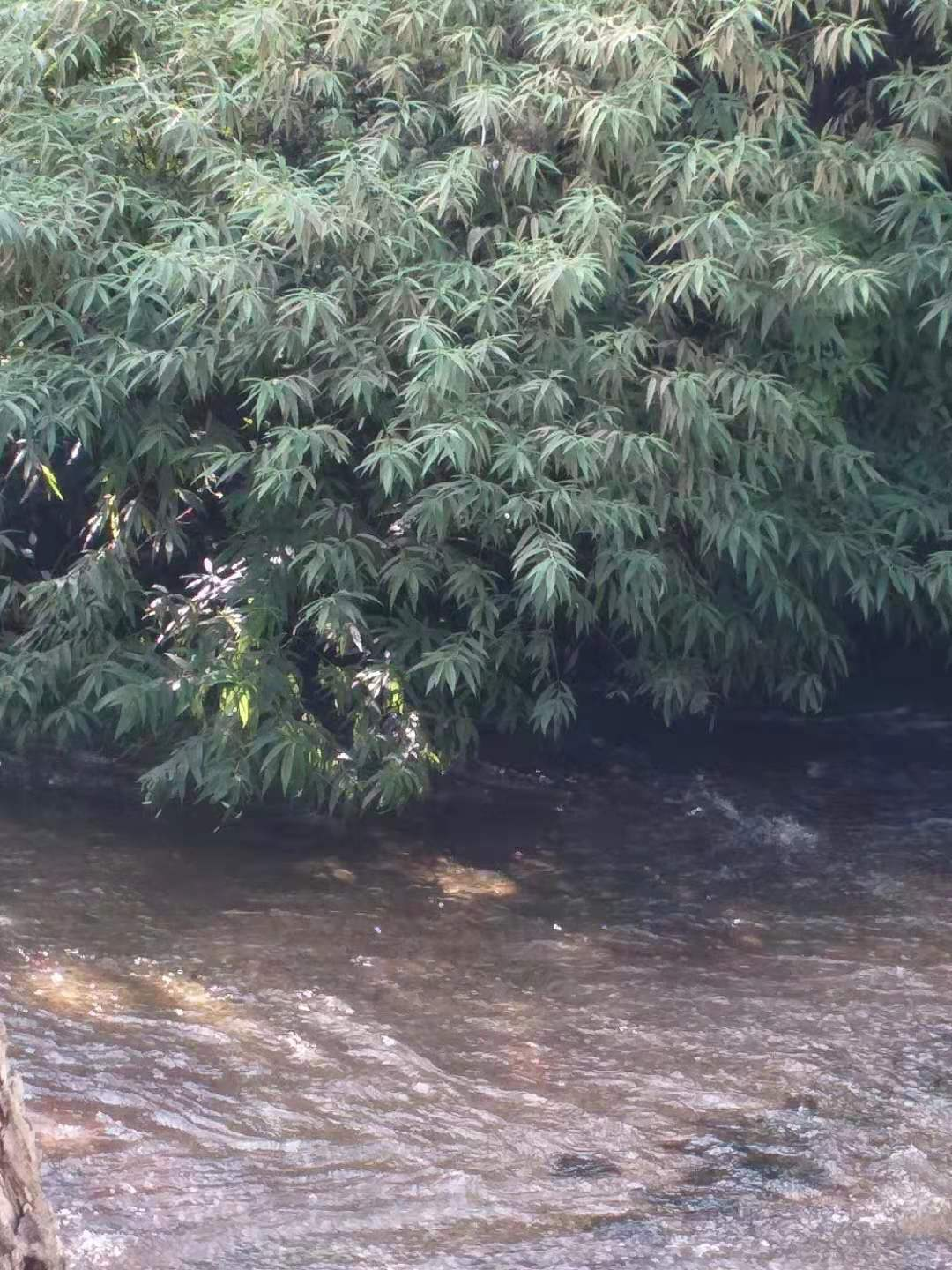
Growing often at the water's edge, in Lijiang of Yunnan province, China.

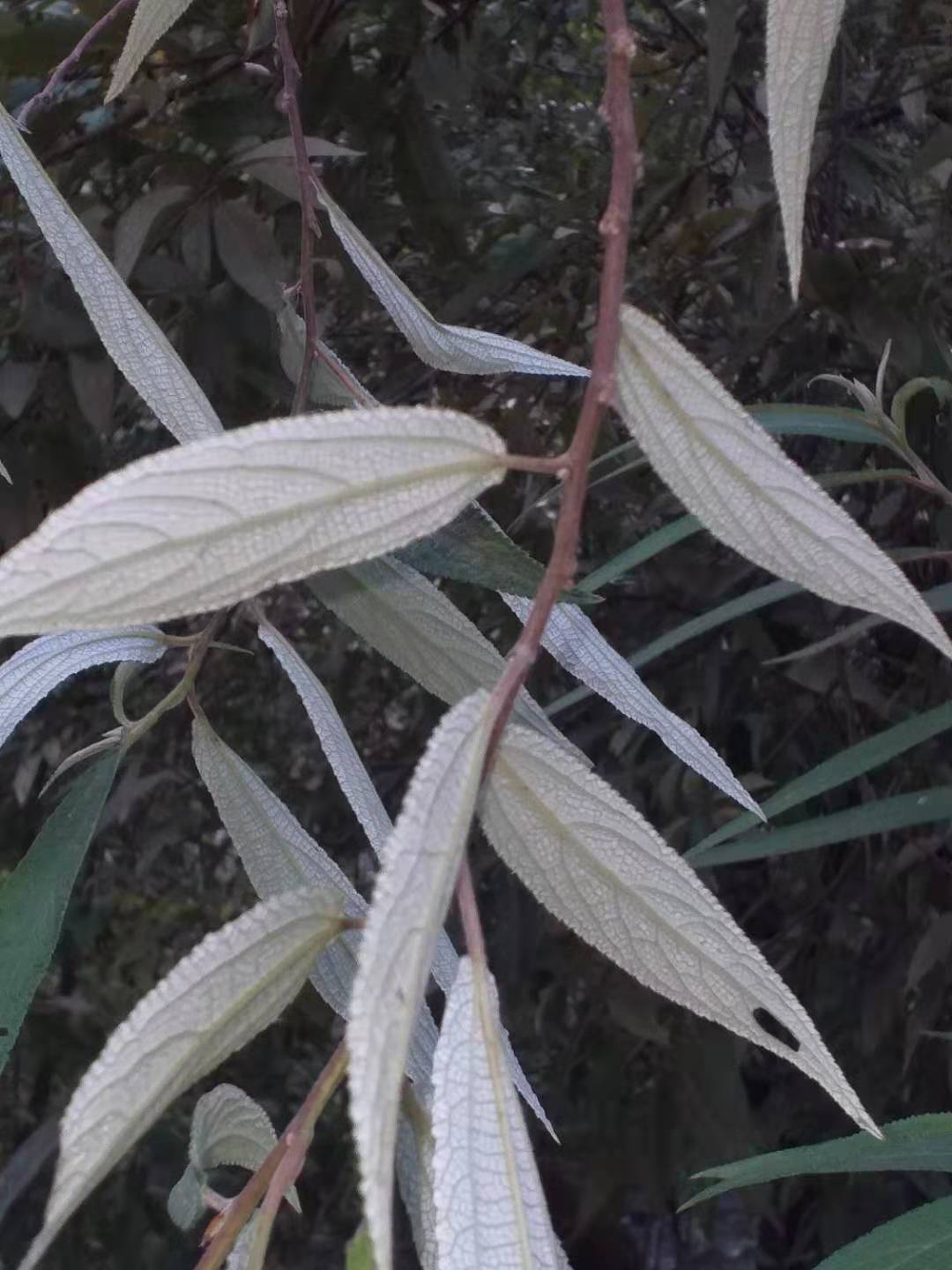
The color of the back of the leaf, in Lijiang of Yunnan province, China.
