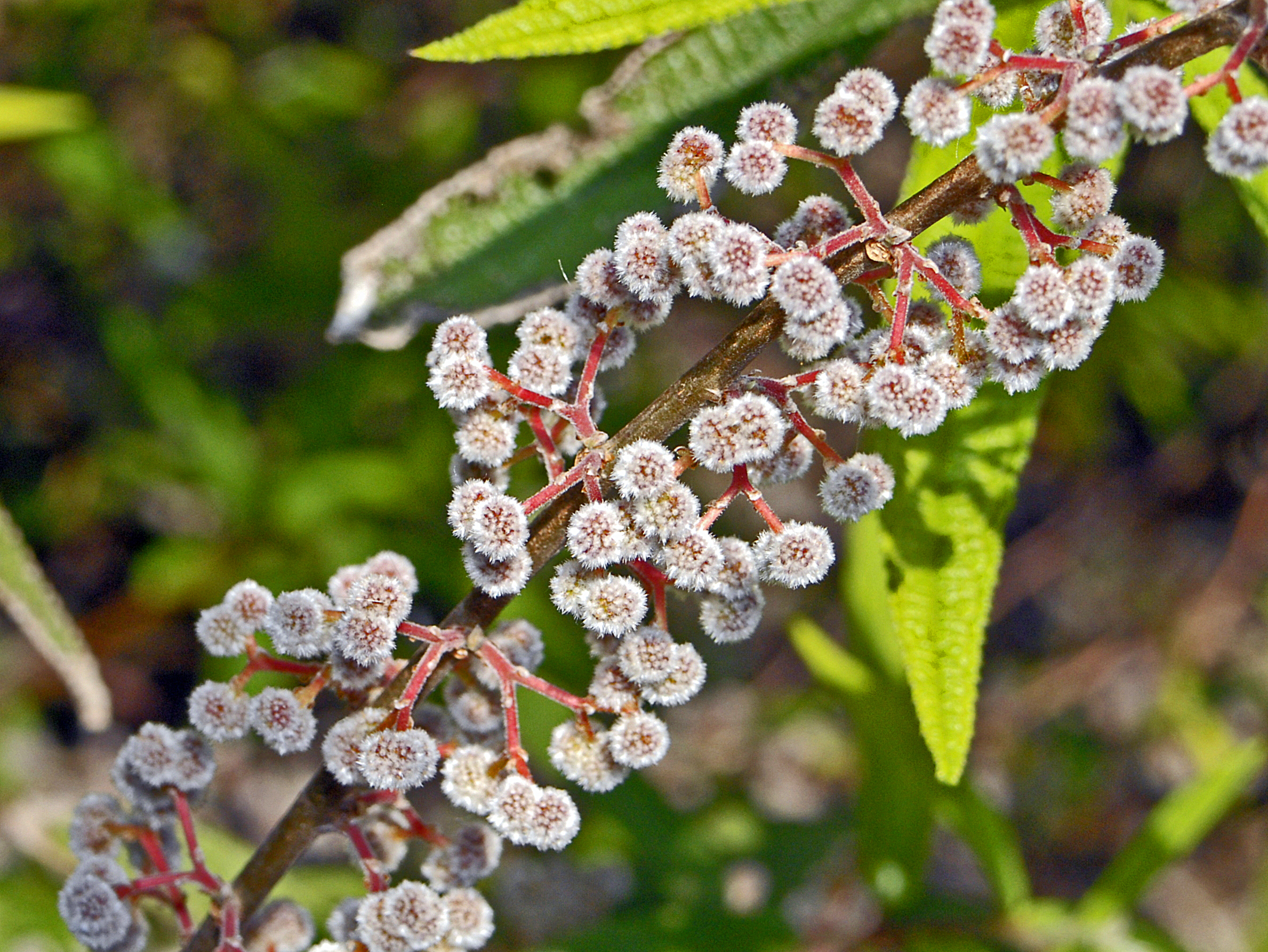
- Female flowers of Debregeasia orientalis

Scientific classification
- Kingdom: Plantae
- Clade: Tracheophytes
- Clade: Angiosperms
- Clade: Eudicots
- Clade: Rosids
- Order: Rosales
- Family: Urticaceae
- Tribe: Boehmerieae
- Genus: Debregeasia; Gaudich.

Synonyms
- Missiessya Gaudich. ex Wedd.; Leucocnide Miq.; Morocarpus Siebold & Zucc.

= Debregeasia =

Genus of flowering plants

Debregeasia is a genus of plants in the nettle family Urticaceae native to areas from northern Africa to China, Southeast Asia and Australia.

== Species ==
As of 9 April 2024, eight species are recognised by Plants of the World Online, as follows:

- Debregeasia australis Friis, Wilmot-Dear & C.J.Chen - Queensland (Australia)
- Debregeasia elliptica C.J.Chen - Yunnan, Guangxi (China), Vietnam
- Debregeasia hekouensis W.T.Wang - Yunnan
- Debregeasia longifolia (Burm.f.) Wedd. - India, Nepal, Tibet, China, Mainland Southeast Asia, Malesia
- Debregeasia orientalis C.J.Chen - Nepal, Tibet, China, Taiwan, Japan
- Debregeasia saeneb (Forssk.) Hepper & J.R.I.Wood - Ethiopia, Eritrea, Saudi Arabia, Yemen, Afghanistan, Pakistan, India, Tibet, Xinjiang (China)
- Debregeasia squamata King ex Hook.f. - Assam (India), southern China, western Malesia
- Debregeasia wallichiana Wedd. - India, Nepal, Bangladesh, Sri Lanka, Andaman Islands, southern China, Cambodia, Vietnam, Laos, Myanmar, Thailand
