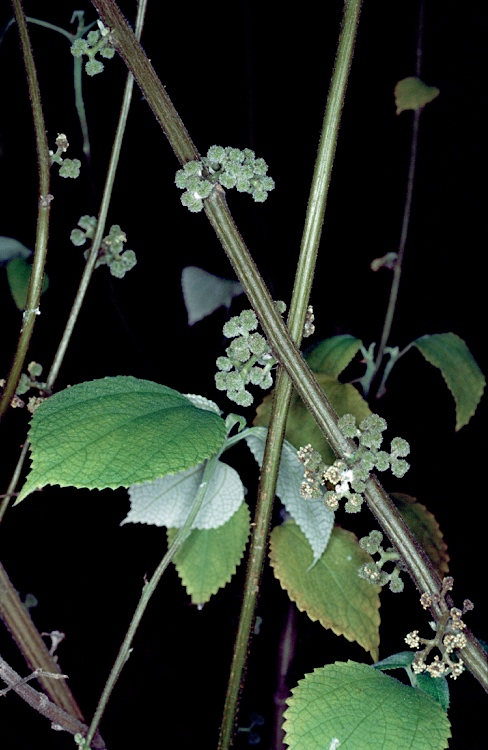
- Foliage, flowers and fruit

Conservation status
- Least Concern (NCA)

Scientific classification
- Kingdom: Plantae
- Clade: Tracheophytes
- Clade: Angiosperms
- Clade: Eudicots
- Clade: Rosids
- Order: Rosales
- Family: Urticaceae
- Genus: Debregeasia
- Species: D. australis

Binomial name
- Debregeasia australis Friis, Wilmot-Dear & C.J.Chen

= Debregeasia australis =

China grass

Species of flowering plant

Debregeasia australis, commonly known as china grass or native ramie, is a plant in the nettle family Urticaceae endemic to Queensland, Australia.

== Description ==
Debregeasia australis is a shrub or small tree growing to about 5 m (16 ft) tall, but will flower and fruit at about 2 m (6 ft 7 in). The leaves are broadly ovate, up to 17 cm (6.7 in) long and 14 cm (5.5 in) wide, green above and bright white underneath, and the margins (edges) are toothed. They have 3–4 pairs of lateral veins, the first pair of which depart from the midrib at the very base of the leaf blade and extend about 2/3 of the way to the apex. The petiole measures up to 9 cm (3.5 in) long, and the stipules up to 8 mm (0.31 in) long.

The inflorescences occur in the leaf axils and consist of clusters of very small flowers - male flowers are about 1 mm (0.04 in) long while female flowers are about 0.5 mm (0.02 in) long. The fruit is an achene about 0.7 mm (0.03 in) long.

== Taxonomy ==
This species was first described by the botanists Ib Friis, Christine Melanie Wilmot-Dear and Chia Jui Chen, and published in the Edinburgh Journal of Botany in 2012. Prior to this, the Queensland plants had been misidentified as Boehmeria nivea.

== Distribution and habitat ==
This species is endemic to Queensland, from the Mackay area north to about Cape Tribulation. It occurs mostly on the sub-coastal tablelands at 400–1,000 m (1,300–3,300 ft), occasionally reaching the coastal lowlands, and it grows on rainforest margins and beside streams in very wet areas.

== Conservation ==
This species is listed by the Queensland Government's Department of Environment, Science and Innovation as least concern. As of 8 April 2024, it has not been assessed by the International Union for Conservation of Nature (IUCN).

== Gallery ==
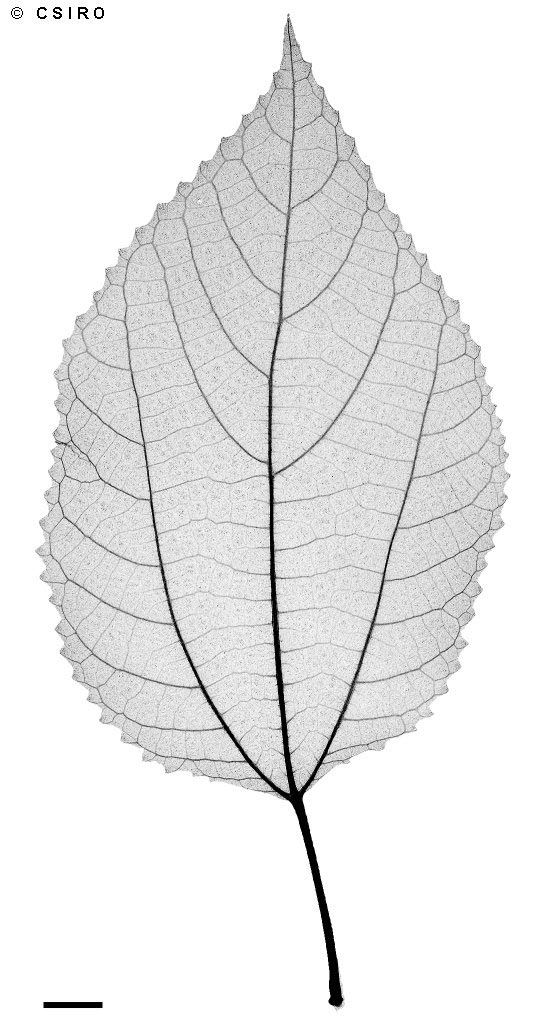
X-ray of lead

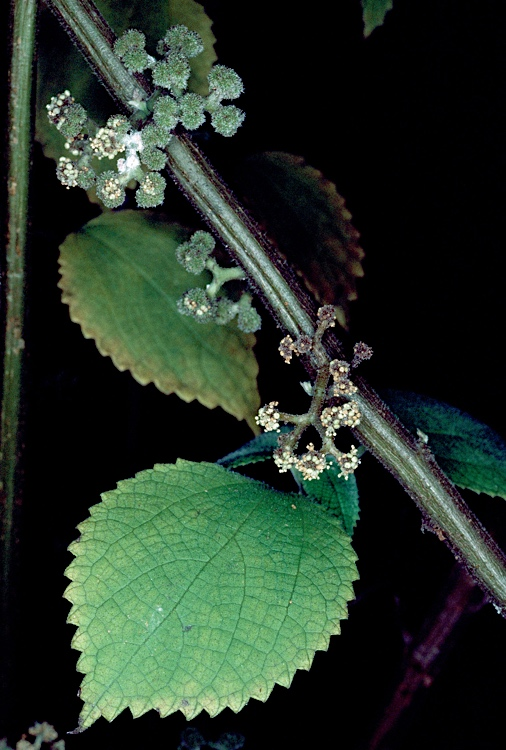
Foliage and flowers

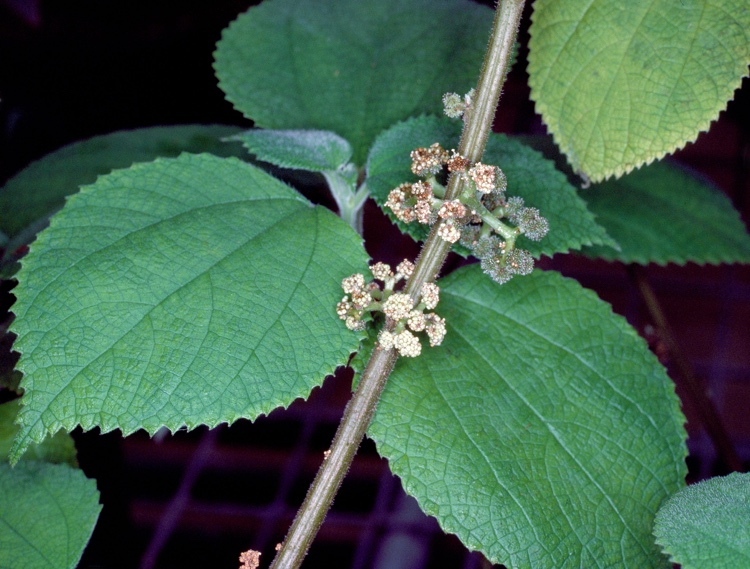
Foliage and flowers

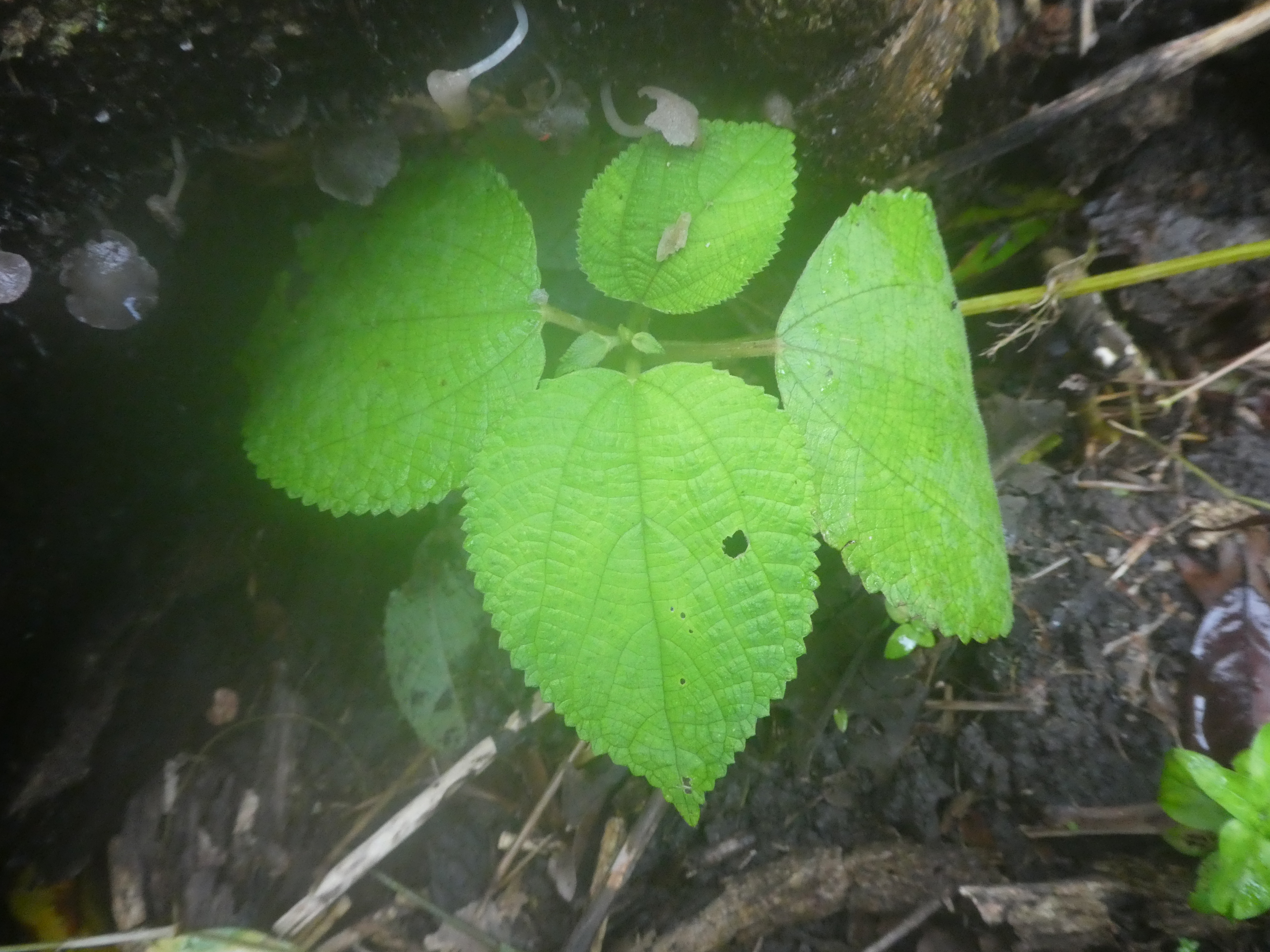
Seedling growing beside Babinda Creek
