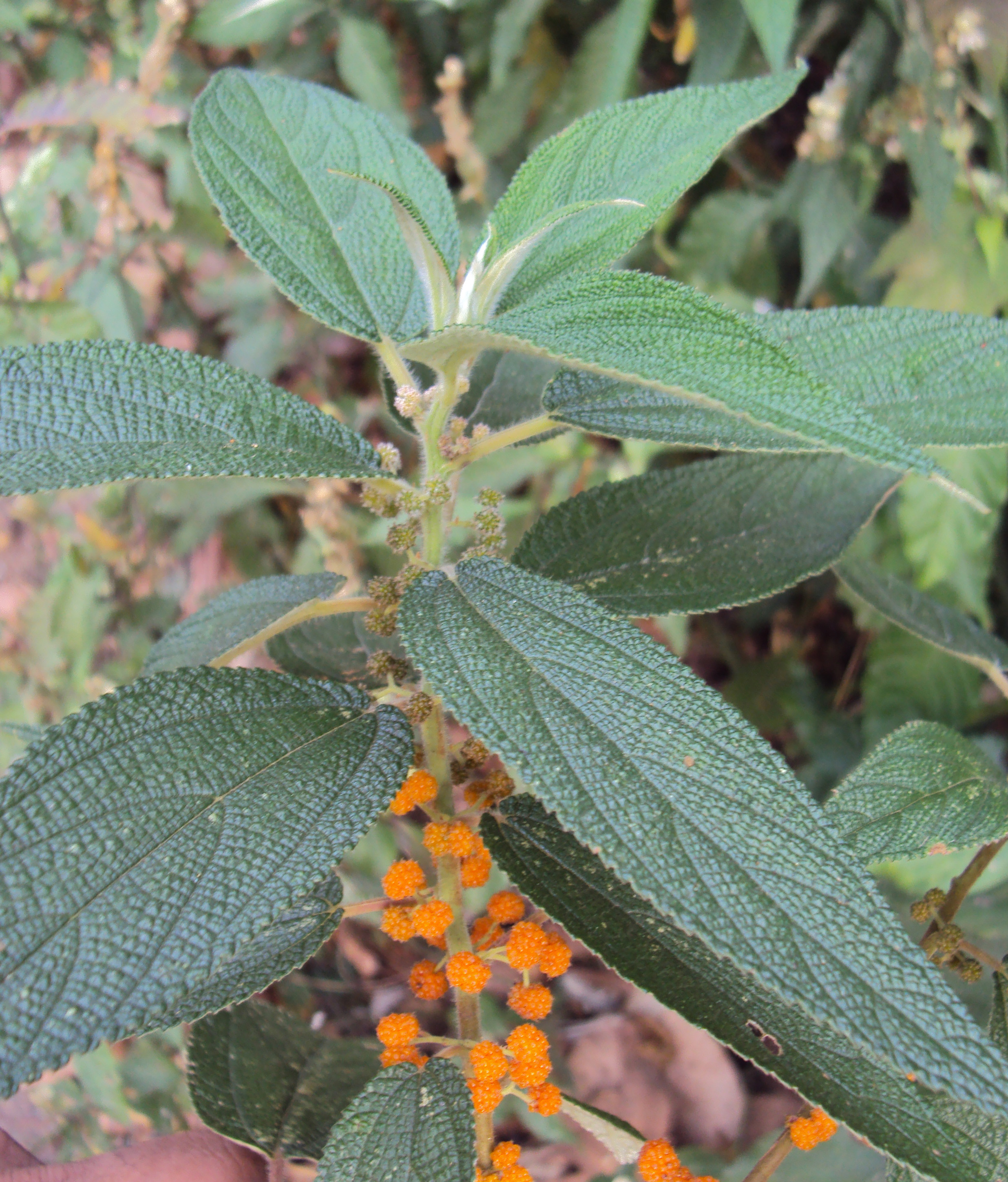
- Leaves and fruits

Conservation status
- Least Concern (IUCN 3.1)

Scientific classification
- Kingdom: Plantae
- Clade: Tracheophytes
- Clade: Angiosperms
- Clade: Eudicots
- Clade: Rosids
- Order: Rosales
- Family: Urticaceae
- Genus: Debregeasia
- Species: D. longifolia

Binomial name
- Debregeasia longifolia (Burm.f.) Wedd.

Synonyms
- Boehmeria angustata Hassk.; Boehmeria dichotoma Hassk.; Conocephalus niveus Wight; Debregeasia angustifolia C.B.Rob.; Debregeasia dichotoma (Blume) Wedd.; Debregeasia libera J.J.Chien & C.J.Chen; Debregeasia luteocarpa Elmer; Debregeasia velutina Gaudich.; Missiessya velutina Wedd.; Morocarpus dichotomus Blume; Morocarpus longifolius (Burm. f.) Blume; Morocarpus velutinus Blume; Urtica angustata Blume; Urtica dichotoma Blume; Urtica longifolia Burm. f.

= Debregeasia longifolia =

Species of flowering plant

Debregeasia longifolia also known as Orange Wild Rhea, is a large shrub growing up to a height of 5 meters seen in wet areas from plains to 1500m. Commonly found in India, Sri Lanka, Myanmar, Indo-China, west China and Malesia. In Matupi Township, Chin, Debregeasia longifolia is also known as Haikaeng Thing. Its wood is used for making charcoal and fiber used for fishing-lines. The fiber extracted from bark is used for house construction.
