= Nothocnide =

Scientific classification
- Kingdom: Plantae
- Clade: Tracheophytes
- Clade: Angiosperms
- Clade: Eudicots
- Clade: Rosids
- Order: Rosales
- Family: Urticaceae
- Tribe: Boehmerieae
- Genus: Nothocnide; Blume

Genus of plants

Nothocnide is a genus of flowering plants belonging to the family Urticaceae.

Its native range is Malesia to the Southwestern Pacific.

== Species ==
Species:

- Nothocnide discolor (C.B.Rob.) Chew
- Nothocnide melastomatifolia (K.Schum.) Chew
- Nothocnide mollissima (Wedd.) Chew
- Nothocnide repanda (Blume) Blume
