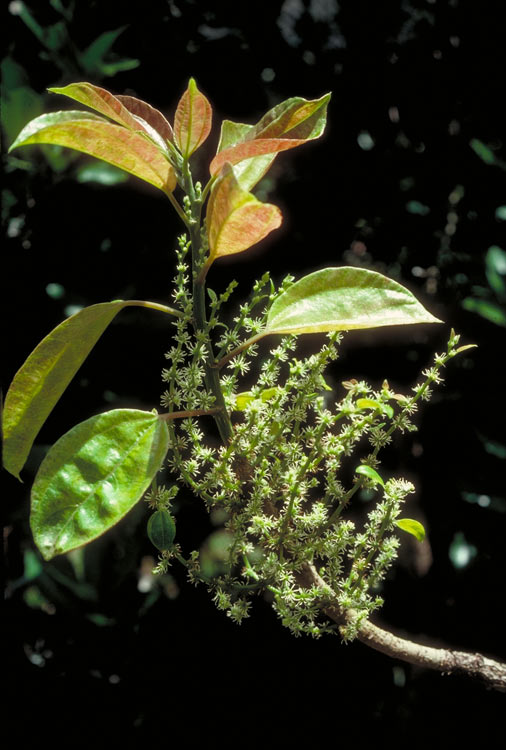
- Foliage and flowers

Conservation status
- Least Concern (NCA)

Scientific classification
- Kingdom: Plantae
- Clade: Embryophytes
- Clade: Tracheophytes
- Clade: Spermatophytes
- Clade: Angiosperms
- Clade: Eudicots
- Clade: Rosids
- Order: Rosales
- Family: Urticaceae
- Genus: Nothocnide
- Species: N. repanda

Binomial name
- Nothocnide repanda (Blume) Blume

Synonyms
- 10 synonyms: Boehmeria repanda (Blume) Hassk.; Perlarius repandus (Blume) Kuntze; Pipturus repandus (Blume) Wedd.; Pseudopipturus repandus (Blume) Skottsb.; Urtica repanda Blume; Boehmeria rubrinervia Hassk.; Boehmeria trinervis Miq.; Pipturus ellipticus Wedd.; Pipturus subalpinus Elmer; Pseudopipturus mabesae Skottsb.

= Nothocnide repanda =

Species of flowering plant

Nothocnide repanda is a species of plant in the nettle family Urticaceae, and is native to Maritime Southeast Asia, some islands of the western Pacific, and the Australian state of Queensland.

== Description ==
This plant is a vine or a scrambling shrub with a stem diameter up to 4 cm (1.6 in). Leaves are simple (without divisions or lobes), arranged alternately along the stems, tri-veined, and up to 15 cm (6 in) long and 7.5 cm (3 in) wide. Flowers are produced on spikes, and there may be up to four spikes per leaf axil. The spikes are about 10 cm (3.9 in) long, the individual flowers are only about 1.5 mm (0.06 in) long. The fruit is an achene.

This species is dioecious, meaning that pistillate (functionally female) and staminate (functionally male) flowers are borne on separate plants.

== Distribution and habitat ==
Nothocnide repanda occurs in Indonesia, the Philippines, the Caroline Islands, Papua New Guinea, the Solomon Islands, New Caledonia, Vanuatu and the northern half of Cape York Peninsula in Queensland (including the Torres Strait Islands). It grows in rainforest and stunted, drier forest.

== Conservation ==
This species is listed as least concern under the Queensland Government's Nature Conservation Act. As of 27 May 2026, it has not been assessed by the International Union for Conservation of Nature (IUCN).
