= Acraea vumbui =

Scientific classification
- Kingdom: Animalia
- Phylum: Arthropoda
- Class: Insecta
- Order: Lepidoptera
- Family: Nymphalidae
- Genus: Acraea
- Species: A. vumbui

Binomial name
- Acraea vumbui Stevenson, 1934

Synonyms
- Acraea conradti r. vumbui Stevenson, 1934; Acraea (Actinote) vumbui; Acraea conradti vumbui; Acraea conradti vumbui ab. barnesi Stevenson, 1940; Acraea conradti vumbui f. cooksoni van Son, 1963

Species of butterfly

Acraea vumbui, the Vumba acraea, is a butterfly in the family Nymphalidae. It is found in eastern Zimbabwe. The habitat consists of forests.

Adults are on wing year round, but peaks occur in late summer.

The larvae feed on Urera hypselodendron.

It is a member of the Acraea circeis species group - but see also Pierre & Bernaud, 2014 (new synonym of Acraea conradti kuekenthali Le Doux, 1922)
