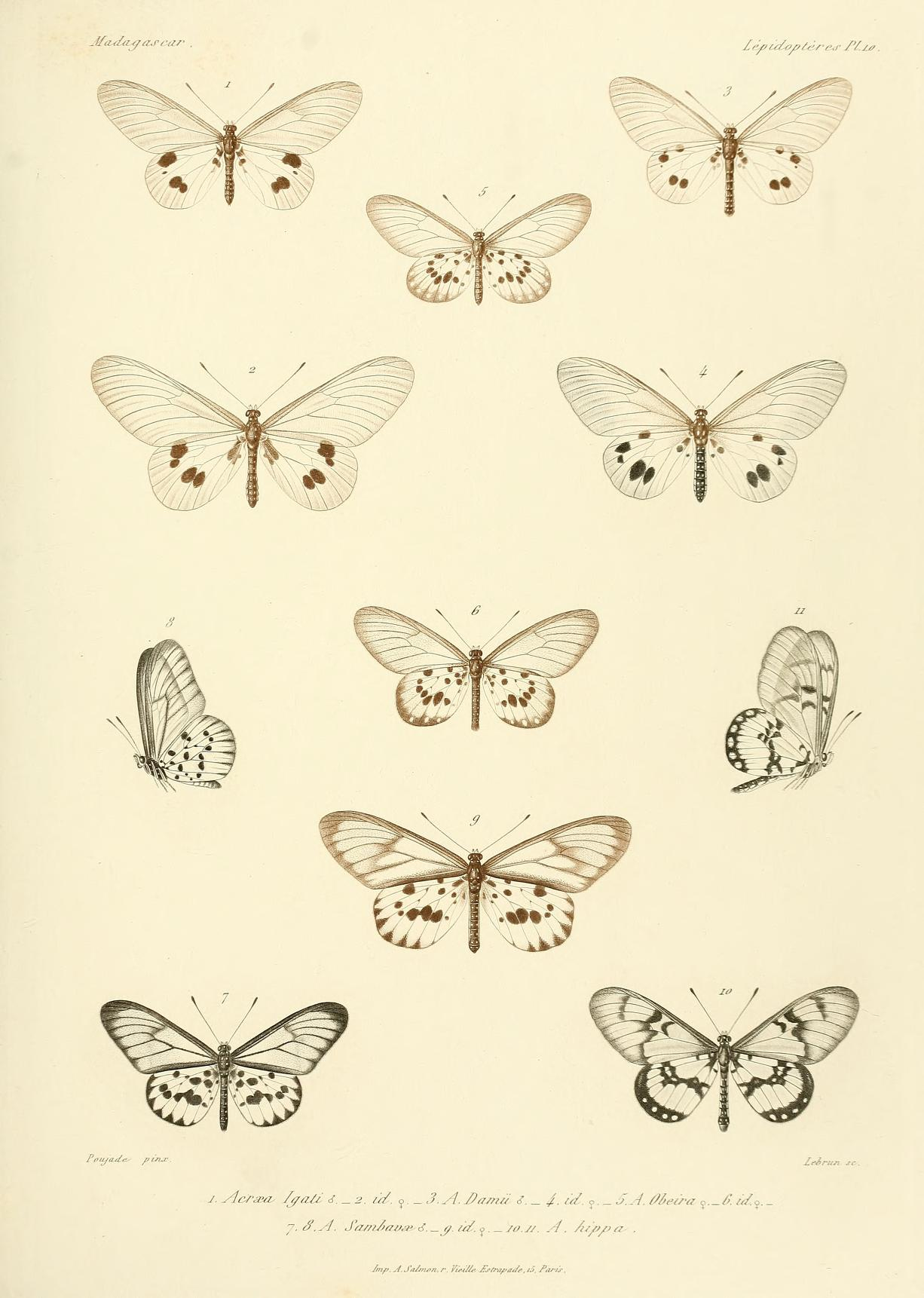

Scientific classification
- Kingdom: Animalia
- Phylum: Arthropoda
- Class: Insecta
- Order: Lepidoptera
- Family: Nymphalidae
- Genus: Acraea
- Species: A. sambavae

Binomial name
- Acraea sambavae Ward, 1873

Synonyms
- Acraea (Actinote) sambavae

= Acraea sambavae =

Species of butterfly

Acraea sambavae is a butterfly in the family Nymphalidae. It is found on Madagascar.

== Description ==
A. sambavae Ward is very similar to the last two species [ A. strattipocles, A. masamba ], but has a more brownish red colour on the upper surface and differs especially in having the marginal band of the hindwing replaced by large black spots at the extremities of the veins; these spots touch one another at the distal margin, but are otherwise quite free; the inner margin of the hindwing broadly whitish yellow. Madagascar.

== Biology ==
The habitat consists of forests.

== Taxonomy ==
It is a member of the Acraea masamba species group- but see also Pierre & Bernaud, 2014.
