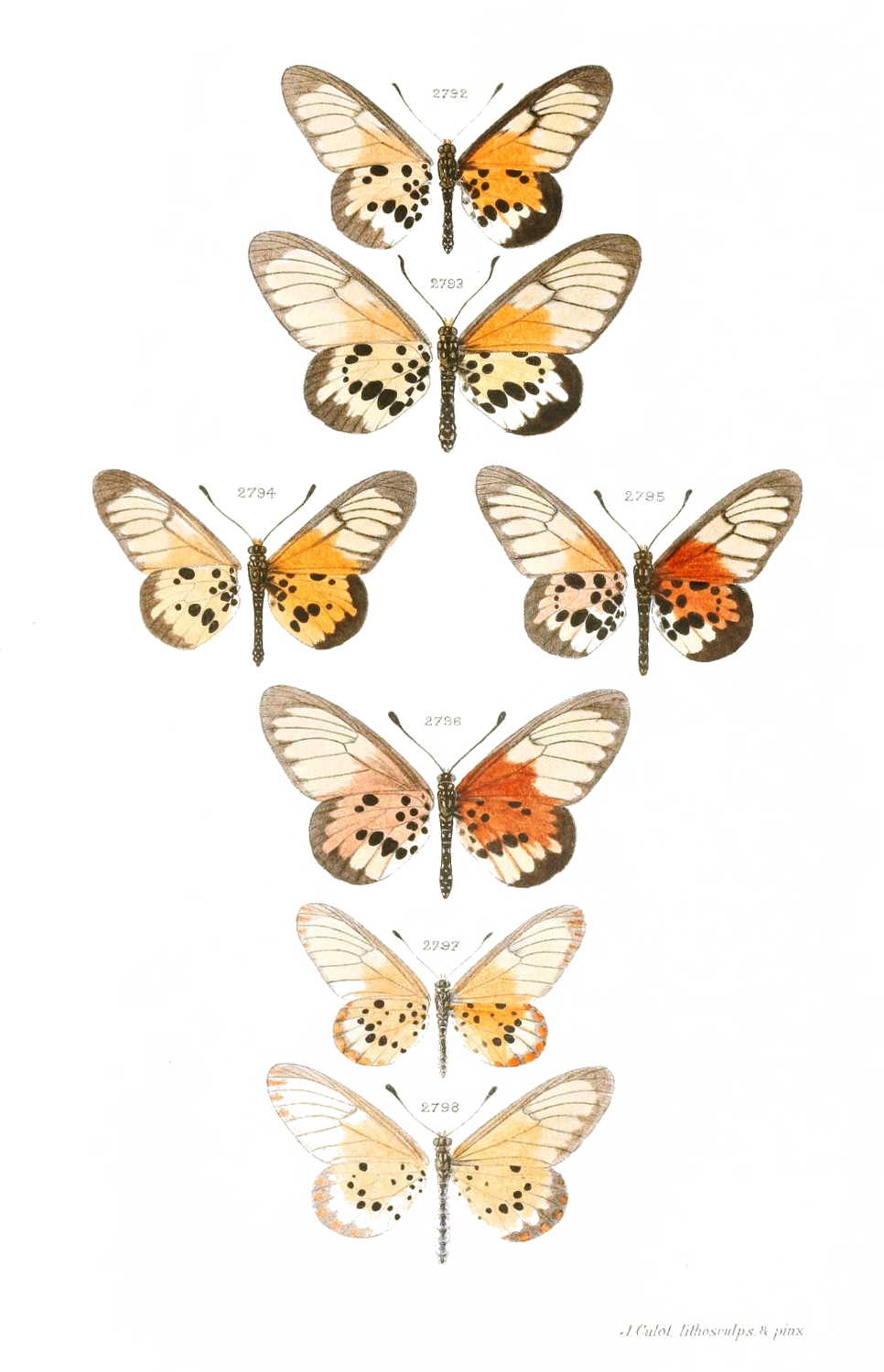

Scientific classification
- Kingdom: Animalia
- Phylum: Arthropoda
- Class: Insecta
- Order: Lepidoptera
- Family: Nymphalidae
- Genus: Acraea
- Species: A. siliana

Binomial name
- Acraea siliana Oberthür, 1916{

Synonyms
- Acraea (Actinote) siliana

= Acraea siliana =

Species of butterfly

Acraea siliana is a butterfly in the family Nymphalidae. It is found on Madagascar. The habitat consists of forests.

== Taxonomy ==
It is a member of the Acraea masamba species group - but see also Pierre & Bernaud, 2014 Junior synonym of Acraea silia Mabille, 1887
