= Acraea kappa =

Scientific classification
- Kingdom: Animalia
- Phylum: Arthropoda
- Class: Insecta
- Order: Lepidoptera
- Family: Nymphalidae
- Genus: Acraea
- Species: A. kappa

Binomial name
- Acraea kappa Pierre, 1979

Synonyms
- Acraea (Acraea) kappa

Species of butterfly

Acraea kappa is a butterfly in the family Nymphalidae. It is found in Tanzania, from the western part of the country to the Kigoma-Mpanda district.

== Taxonomy ==
It is a member of the Acraea terpsicore species group - but see also Pierre & Bernaud, 2014
