= Acraea lyci =

Scientific classification
- Kingdom: Animalia
- Phylum: Arthropoda
- Class: Insecta
- Order: Lepidoptera
- Family: Nymphalidae
- Genus: Acraea
- Species: A. lyci

Binomial name
- Acraea lyci Pierre, 2006

Species of butterfly

Acraea lyci is a butterfly in the family Nymphalidae. It is found in Tanzania.

== Taxonomy ==
See Pierre & Bernaud, 2014
