= Acraea bergeri =

Scientific classification
- Kingdom: Animalia
- Phylum: Arthropoda
- Class: Insecta
- Order: Lepidoptera
- Family: Nymphalidae
- Genus: Acraea
- Species: A. bergeri

Binomial name
- Acraea bergeri Gaede, 1915

Synonyms
- Acraea (Actinote) bergeri

Species of butterfly

Acraea bergeri is a butterfly in the family Nymphalidae. It is found in Uganda.

== Taxonomy ==
It is a member of the Acraea oberthueri species group.- but see also Pierre & Bernaud, 2014
