= Acraea kalinzu =

Scientific classification
- Kingdom: Animalia
- Phylum: Arthropoda
- Class: Insecta
- Order: Lepidoptera
- Family: Nymphalidae
- Genus: Acraea
- Species: A. kalinzu

Binomial name
- Acraea kalinzu Carpenter, 1936

Synonyms
- Acraea (Actinote) kalinzu; Acraea kalinzu var. albipicta Carpenter, 1936

Species of butterfly

Acraea kalinzu is a butterfly in the family Nymphalidae. It is found in western Uganda, the Democratic Republic of the Congo (Kivu) and north-western Tanzania. The habitat consists of montane forests. See Pierre & Bernaud, 2014, for taxonomy.
