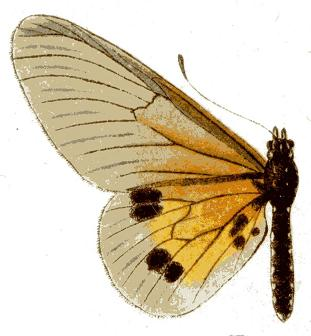

Scientific classification
- Kingdom: Animalia
- Phylum: Arthropoda
- Class: Insecta
- Order: Lepidoptera
- Family: Nymphalidae
- Genus: Acraea
- Species: A. igati

Binomial name
- Acraea igati Boisduval, 1833

Synonyms
- Acraea (Acraea) igati

= Acraea igati =

Species of butterfly

Acraea igati is a butterfly in the family Nymphalidae. It is found on Madagascar and the Comoros.

== Description ==
Very similar to Acraea dammii but the hindwing in cellule 7 with a large black spot directly before the spot in 6, but without other spots in 7. Basal area of the wings in the ochre-yellow to brown-yellow, in the female whitish.

== Biology ==
The habitat consists of forests.

== Taxonomy ==
It is a member of the Acraea terpsicore species group- but see also Pierre & Bernaud, 2014
