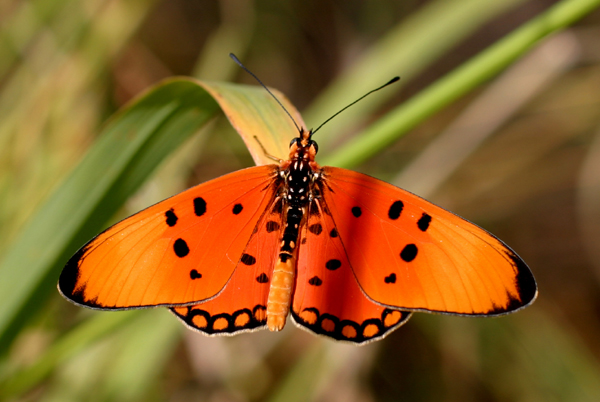
- Adult male fiery acraea (A. acrita)

Scientific classification
- Kingdom: Animalia
- Phylum: Arthropoda
- Clade: Pancrustacea
- Class: Insecta
- Order: Lepidoptera
- Family: Nymphalidae
- Tribe: Acraeini
- Genus: Acraea; Fabricius, 1807

Type species
- Papilio horta (Linnaeus, 1764)

Species
- Presently about 220, see text

Synonyms
- Alacria Henning, 1992; Aphanopeltis Mabille, 1887; Auracraea Henning, 1993; Aurora Henning, 1992 (non Ragonot 1887: preoccupied); Gnesia Doubleday, 1848; Hyalites Doubleday, 1848; Pareba Doubleday, 1848; Phanopeltis Mabille, 1887; Planema Doubleday, 1848; Rubraea Henning, 1992; Solenites Mabille, 1887; Stephenia Henning, 1992; Telchinia Hübner, 1819 (but see text)

= Acraea (butterfly) =

Genus of brush-footed butterflies

Acraea is a genus of brush-footed butterflies (family Nymphalidae) of the subfamily Heliconiinae. It seems to be highly paraphyletic and has long been used as a "wastebin taxon" to unite about 220 species of anatomically conservative Acraeini. Some phylogenetic studies show that the genus Acraea is monophyletic if Bematistes and Neotropical Actinote are included (see Pierre & Bernaud, 2009). Most species assembled here are restricted to the Afrotropical realm, but some are found in India, Southeast Asia, and Australia.

== Biology ==
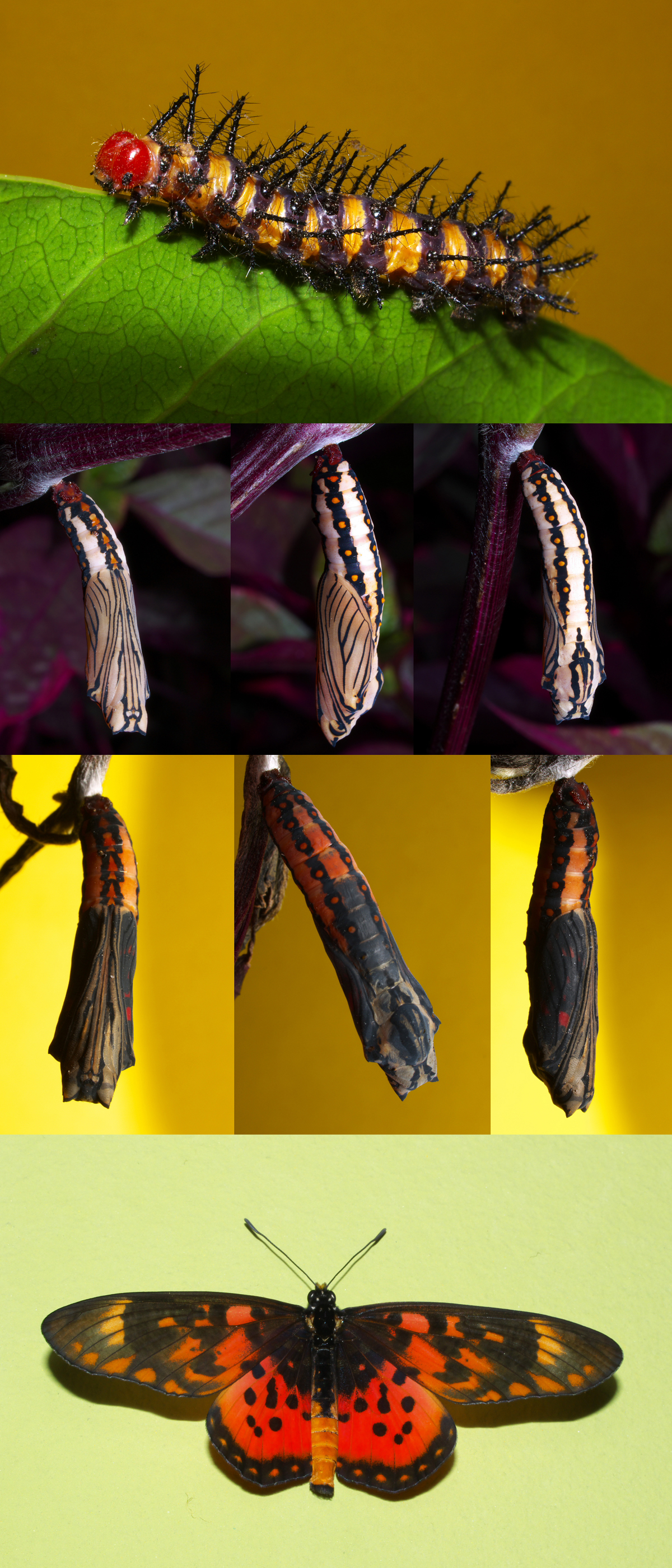
Acraea zetes larva, pupae and imago

The eggs are laid in masses; the larvae are rather short, of almost equal thickness throughout, and possessing branched spines on each segment, young larvae group together on a protecting mass of silk; the pupa is slender, with a long abdomen, rather wide and angulated about the insertion of the wings, and suspended by the tail only. A. horta, A. cabira, and A. terpsicore illustrate typical life histories. The food plants of Acraea caterpillars are usually Urticaceae or, like in most Heliconiinae, Passifloraceae. Some feed on other plants, such as Fabaceae, "Flacourtiaceae", or Violaceae. Their preferred species contain cyanogenic glycosides, which make the larvae and adults poisonous to predators. The aposematic coloration of the adults announces this, and some species are mimicked by less noxious butterflies. At least some "Acraea" are able to produce the toxins themselves. Their flight is slow and flapping.

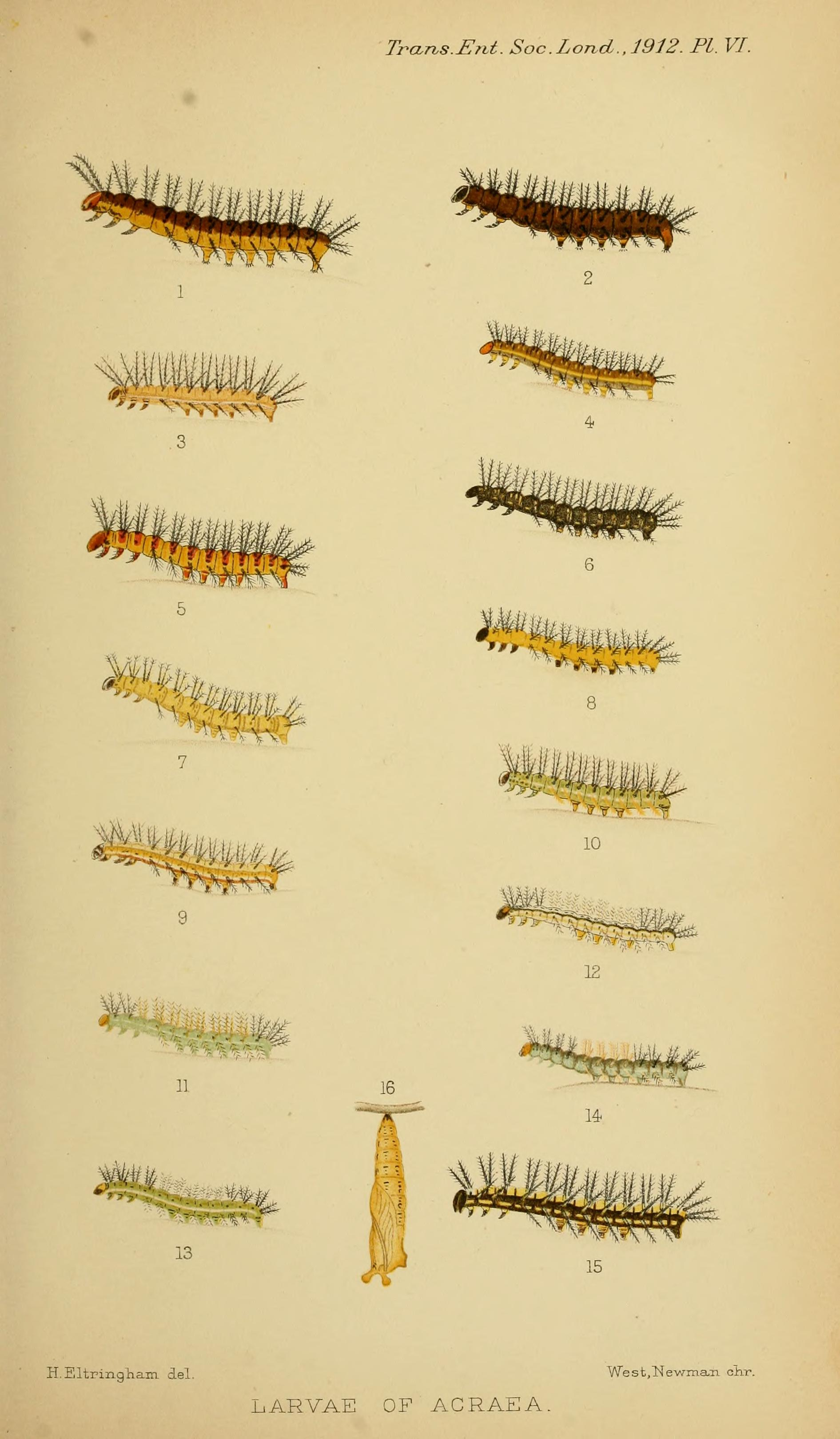

== Systematics and taxonomy ==
That all these species were properly placed in Acraea has never been generally accepted. In 1807, Johan Christian Fabricius established the genus for the garden acraea, described as Papilio horta by Carl Linnaeus in 1764, and its relatives. By and by, an increasing number of species were placed here. As early as 1848, and again in 1887 and the early 1990s, it was attempted to divide the genus into groups of closest relatives, as it was suspected that some "Acraea" might actually be closer to other genera in the tribe Acraeini.

With increasing availability of DNA sequence data, it is confirmed that Acraea as loosely defined does not constitute a monophyletic group. Even before the attempts to split up Acraea in earnest had begun, Jacob Hübner in 1819 suggested to separate species around Acraea serena as Telchinia. This name has been applied to a generally African group whose members usually feed on Urticaceae, and they had already been noted to bear some uncanny resemblances to the American Actinote in anatomical details. Indeed, they seem to be closer relatives of these than of the other butterflies placed in Acraea, which usually feed on Passifloraceae and are at least in part quite close relatives of the African genus Bematistes. Those closest to that genus might warrant separation as Rubraea or Stephenia.

But while several informal species groups have been established, it is not clear which of these are monophyletic and how to split the apparently still paraphyletic genus further. The placement of the garden acraea—the type species—and hence which of the any further subdivisions will get to bear the name Acraea, remains unresolved. As it is traditionally included in the former A. terpsicore group (now A. serena group) and its caterpillars, while polyphagous, do not feed on Urticaceae, it may be that the separation of Telchinia is unwarranted and other proposed genera might be resurrected instead.

There was one major misidentification which still causes confusion today. Acraea terpsicore, described as Papilio terpsicore by Linnaeus in 1758, was held to be the senior synonym of A. serena, described by Fabricius as Papilio serena in 1775. Hence, the former name was commonly used for that African species. But as it turned out, Linnaeus had actually described an Indian species—the well-known tawny coaster. Fabricius in 1793 believed it was new to science and described it again, as Papilio violae. Consequently, it had been long known as A. violae. It was also recognized that Fabricius' little-studied P. serena was none other than the orange acraea. For this, the name A. eponina, from the Papilio eponina established in the 1780 issue of Pieter Cramer's De uitlandsche Kapellen, had been used all the time. Another instance of the confusion rife in this genus is exemplified by Boisduval's Acraea manjaca.

These developments come from two papers written by J. Pierre and D. Bernaud.

== Species ==
Since the proposed phylogenetic sequence of the species groups is almost certainly incorrect for a large part, the groups are simply listed alphabetically.

J. Pierre & D. Bernaud have published a complete systematic and synonymic list.

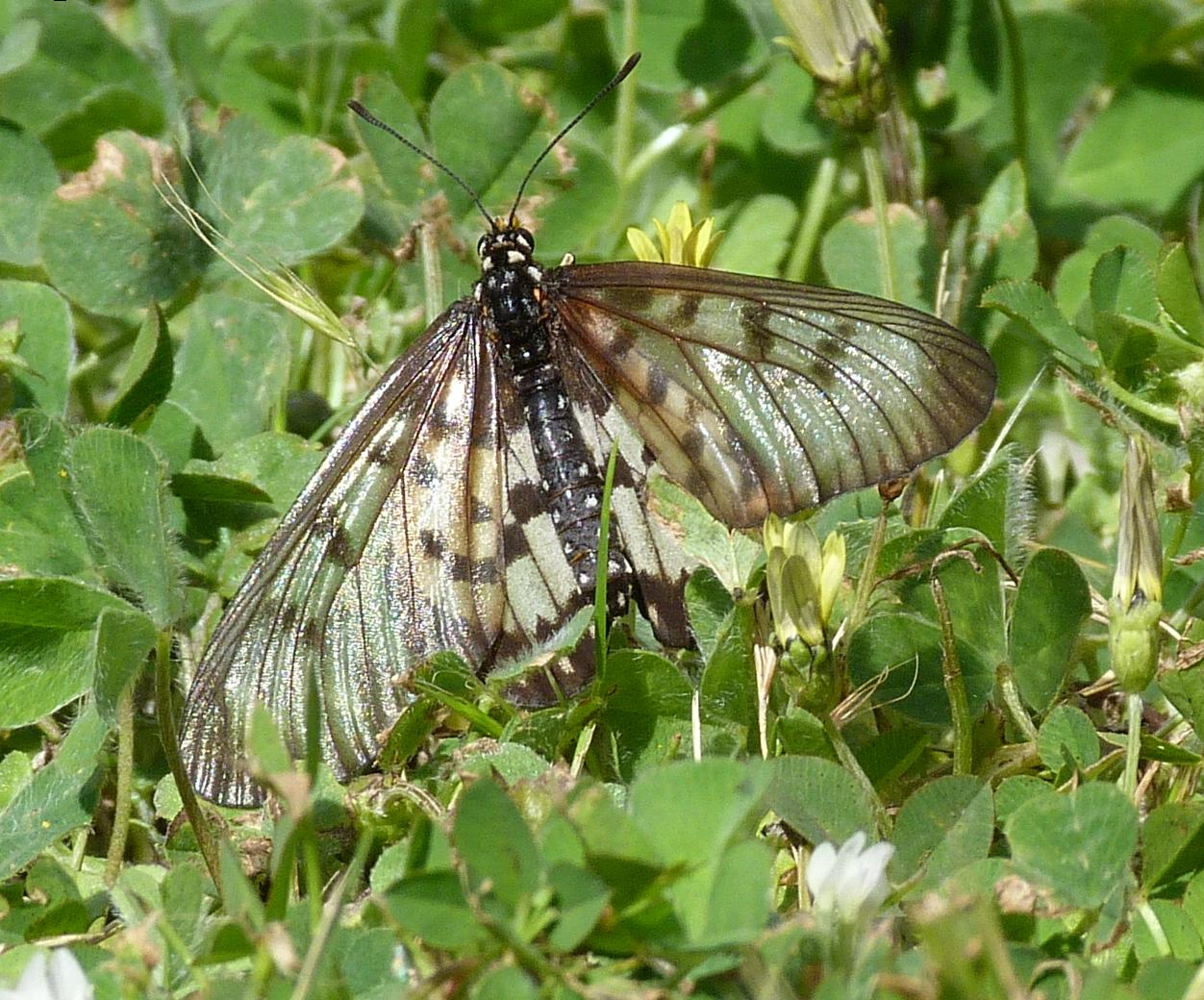
Small greasy (A. andromacha)

Acraea acrita species group

- Acraea acrita – fiery acraea
- Acraea annonae
- Acraea bellona
- Acraea chaeribula
- Acraea eltringhamiana
- Acraea guluensis
- Acraea loranae
- Acraea lualabae
- Acraea manca
- Acraea pudorina – Kenyan fiery acraea
- Acraea utengulensis – Tanzanian fiery acraea

Acraea andromacha species group (close to part of A. terpsicore group?)

- Acraea andromacha – small greasy, glasswing

Acraea anemosa species group

- Acraea anemosa – broad-bordered acraea
- Acraea pseudolycia
- Acraea turna

Acraea aureola species group

- Acraea aureola (= onerata) (cepheus group)

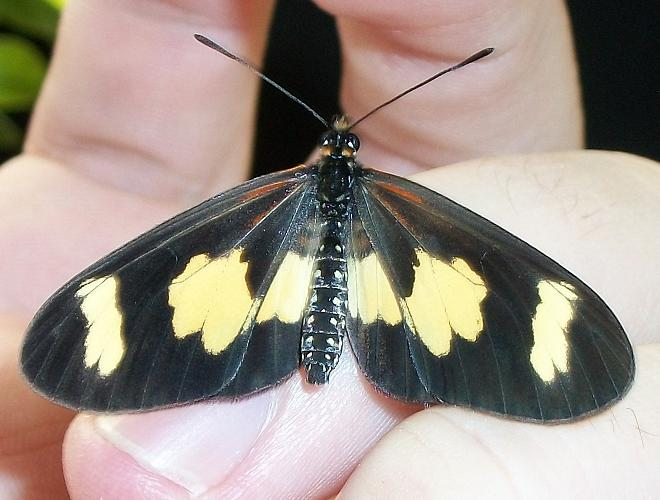
Yellow-banded acraea (A. cabira)

Acraea bonasia species group (close to A. oberthuri and A. rahira groups? Paraphyletic?)

- Acraea acerata – small yellow-banded legionnaire, falls acraea
- Acraea alicia
- Acraea bonasia
- Acraea burgessi
- Acraea cabira – yellow-banded acraea
- Acraea serena – dancing acraea
- Acraea eponina – orange acraea or small orange acraea
- Acraea excelsior
- Acraea goetzei
- Acraea karschi
- Acraea lumiri
- Acraea rangatana
- Acraea hecqui
- Acraea pierrei
- Acraea sotikensis – Sotik acraea, Sotika legionnaire
- Acraea uvui – tiny acraea
- Acraea ventura

Acraea caecilia species group (close to A. cepheus and A. egina groups?)

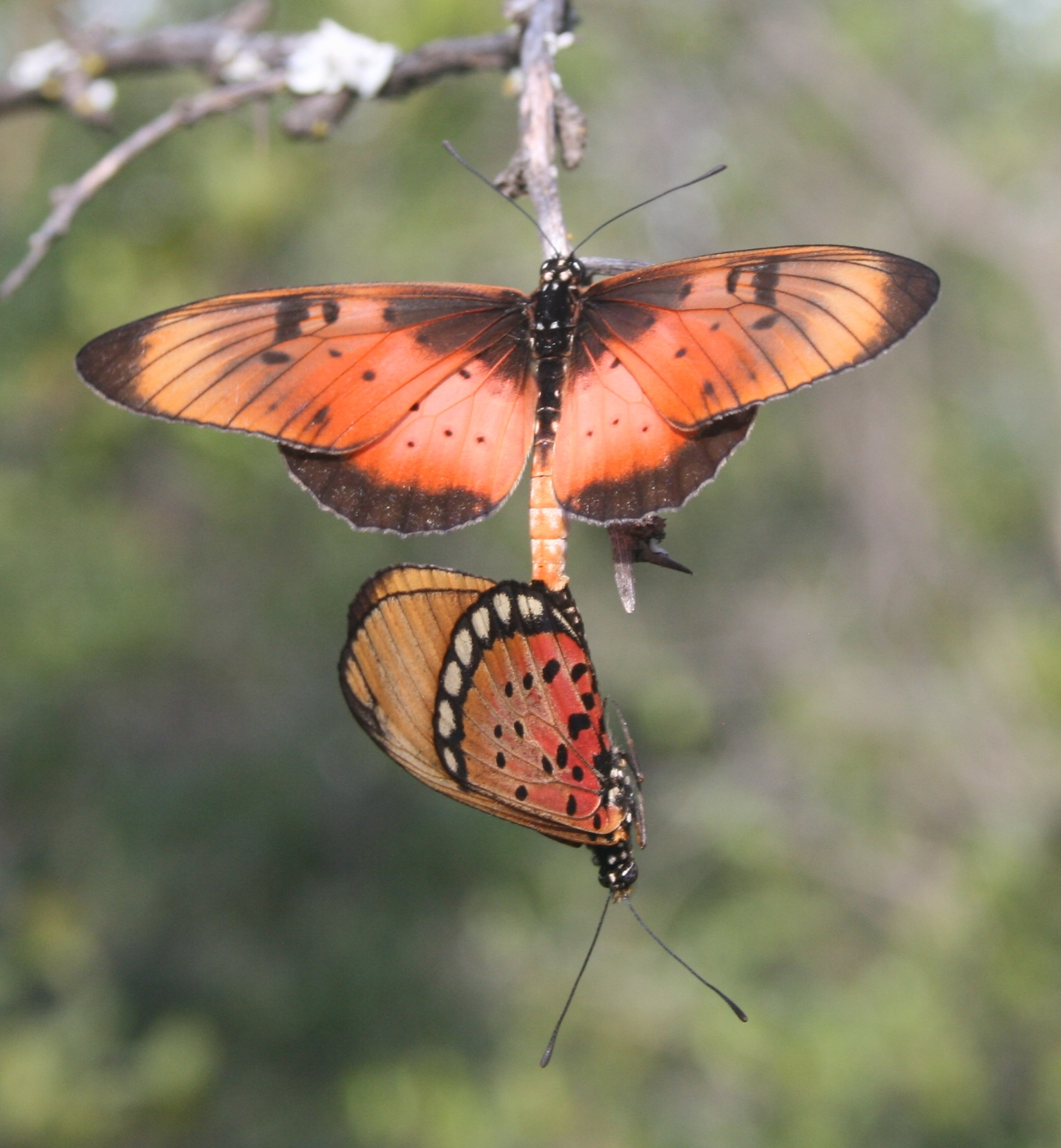
Natal legionnaires (A. natalica)

- Acraea aglaonice – clear-spotted acraea
- Acraea mirabilis – marvelous acraea
- Acraea miranda – desert acraea, Somali acraea
- Acraea asboloplintha – black-winged acraea, black-winged legionnaire
- Acraea atergatis
- Acraea atatis
- Acraea axina – little acraea
- Acraea braesia
- Acraea caecilia – pink legionnaire (type species of Stephenia)
- Acraea caldarena – black-tipped acraea, black tip acraea
- Acraea doubledayi
- Acraea ella
- Acraea equatorialis
- Acraea intermediodes
- Acraea leucopyga
- Acraea lygus – lygus acraea
- Acraea marnois (= Acraea caecilia)
- Acraea natalica – Natal acraea, Natal legionnaire
- Acraea oncaea – window acraea, window legionnaire
- Acraea pseudegina
- Acraea pudorella
- Acraea rhodesiana
- Acraea stenobea – suffused acraea
- Acraea lyci
- Acraea sykesi – Sykes' acraea

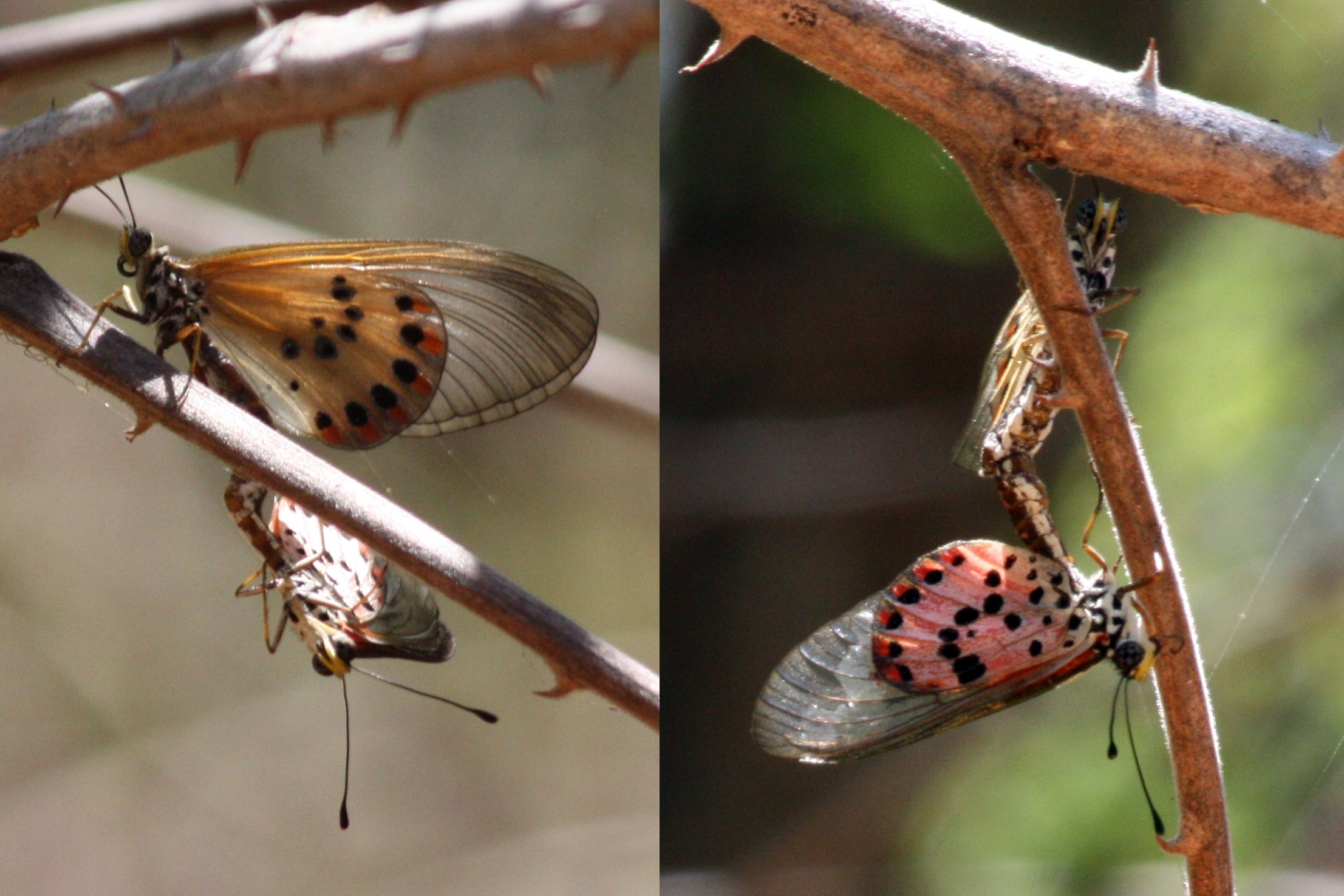
Acraea ranavalona mating, Anjajavy Forest, Madagascar

Acraea cepheus species group (close to A. caecilia and A. egina groups?)

- Acraea abdera
- Acraea asema
- Acraea atolmis
- Acraea bailundensis
- Acraea buettneri
- Acraea cepheus
- Acraea bergeriana
- Acraea chambezi
- Acraea diogenes
- Acraea guillemei
- Acraea lapidorum
- Acraea lofua
- Acraea mansya
- Acraea nohara – light red acraea
- Acraea dondoensis
- Acraea onerata
- Acraea periphanes
- Acraea petraea – blood-red acraea, blood acraea
- Acraea punctellata
- Acraea rohlfsi
- Acraea violarum – speckled red acraea

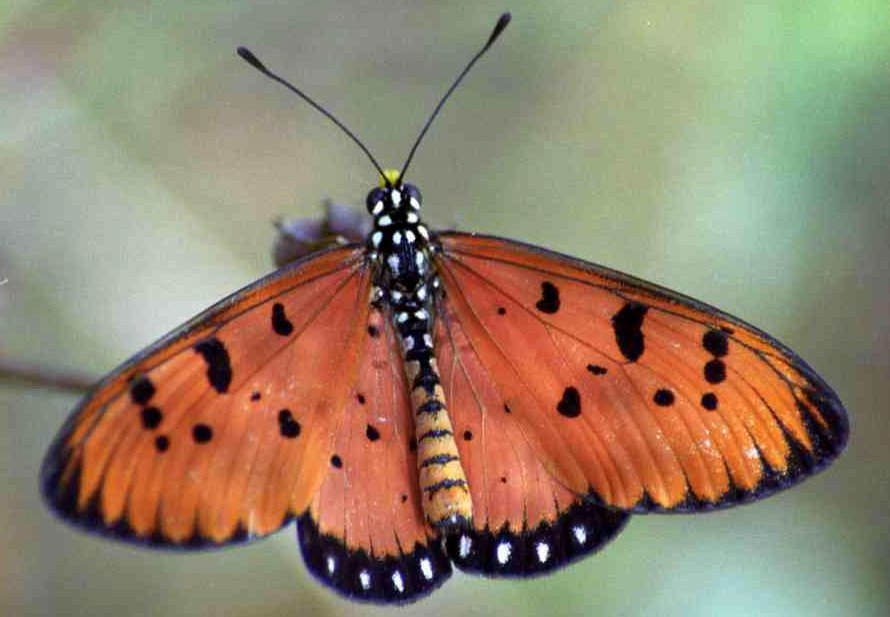
Tawny coster (হরিনছড়া), Acraea violae

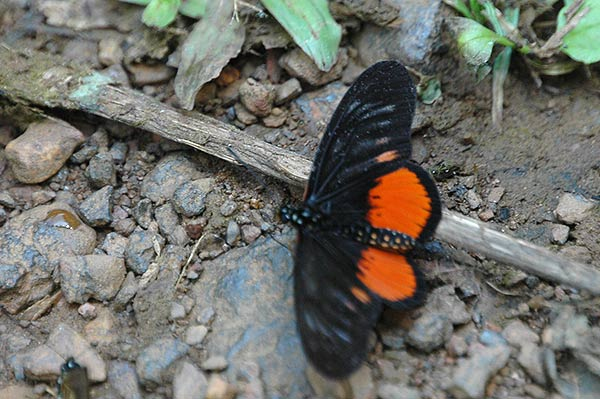
Acraea grosvenori

Acraea circeis species group (close to A. masamba)

- Acraea buschbecki
- Acraea circeis – white legionnaire (type species of Gnesia)
- Acraea conradti
- Acraea grosvenori
- Acraea kuekenthali
- Acraea melanoxantha
- Acraea newtoni
- Acraea ntebiae
- Acraea oreas
- Acraea orina – Orina legionnaire
- Acraea orinata
- Acraea parrhasia – yellow-veined legionnaire
- Acraea pelopeia
- Acraea peneleos
- Acraea penelope – Penelope's acraea, Penelope's legionnaire
- Acraea perenna
- Acraea semivitrea (type species of Alacria)
- Acraea translucida
- Acraea ungemachi
- Acraea vumbui

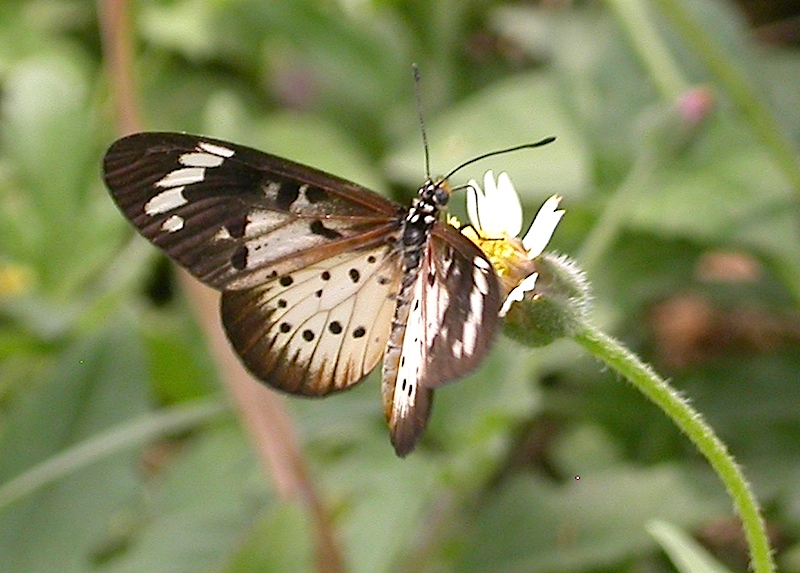
Common acraea (A. encedon)

Acraea egina species group (close to A. caecilia and A. cepheus groups?)

- Acraea egina – elegant legionnaire (type species of Rubraea)
- Acraea medea

Acraea encedon species group (close to A. jodutta and A. pharsalus groups?) – common acraea or white-barred acraea or encedon acraea

- Acraea encedana – Pierre's acraea
- Acraea encedon – common acraea, white-barred legionnaire (type species of Hyalites)
- Acraea necoda
- Acraea encoda

Acraea issoria species group (a rather distinct lineage?)

- Acraea issoria – yellow coster (type species of Pareba)

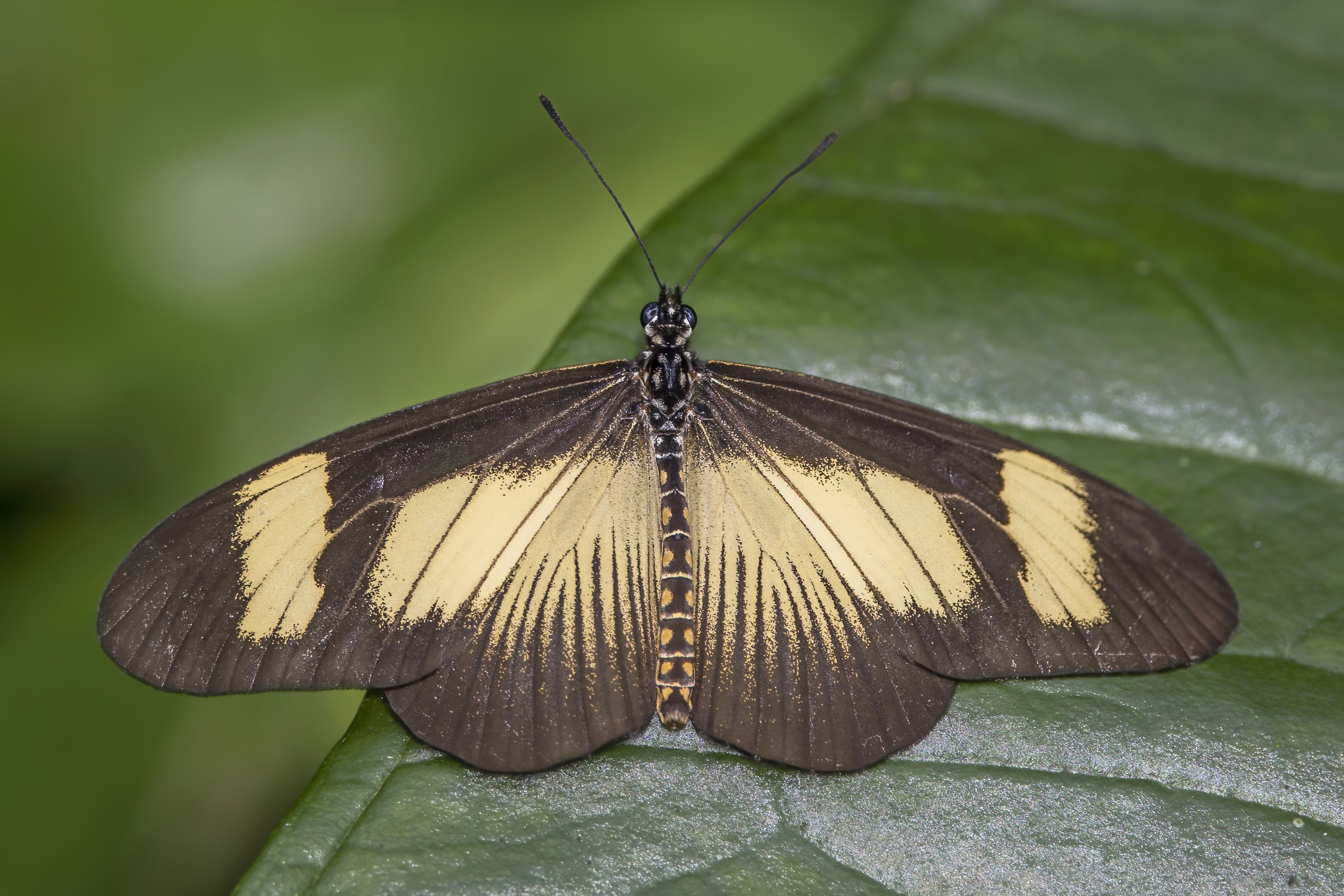
Jodutta legionnaire Acraea jodutta

Acraea jodutta species group (close to A. encedon and A. pharsalus groups?)

- Acraea actinotina
- Acraea acuta
- Acraea alciope
- Acraea alciopoides
- Acraea amicitiae
- Acraea ansorgei
- Acraea aurivillii
- Acraea baxteri
- Acraea disjuncta
- Acraea esebria – dusky acraea
- Acraea comor
- Acraea insularis
- Acraea jodutta – jodutta legionnaire
- Acraea johnstoni
- Acraea lycoa – lycoa legionnaire (type species of Planema)
- Acraea masaris
- Acraea niobe
- Acraea safie

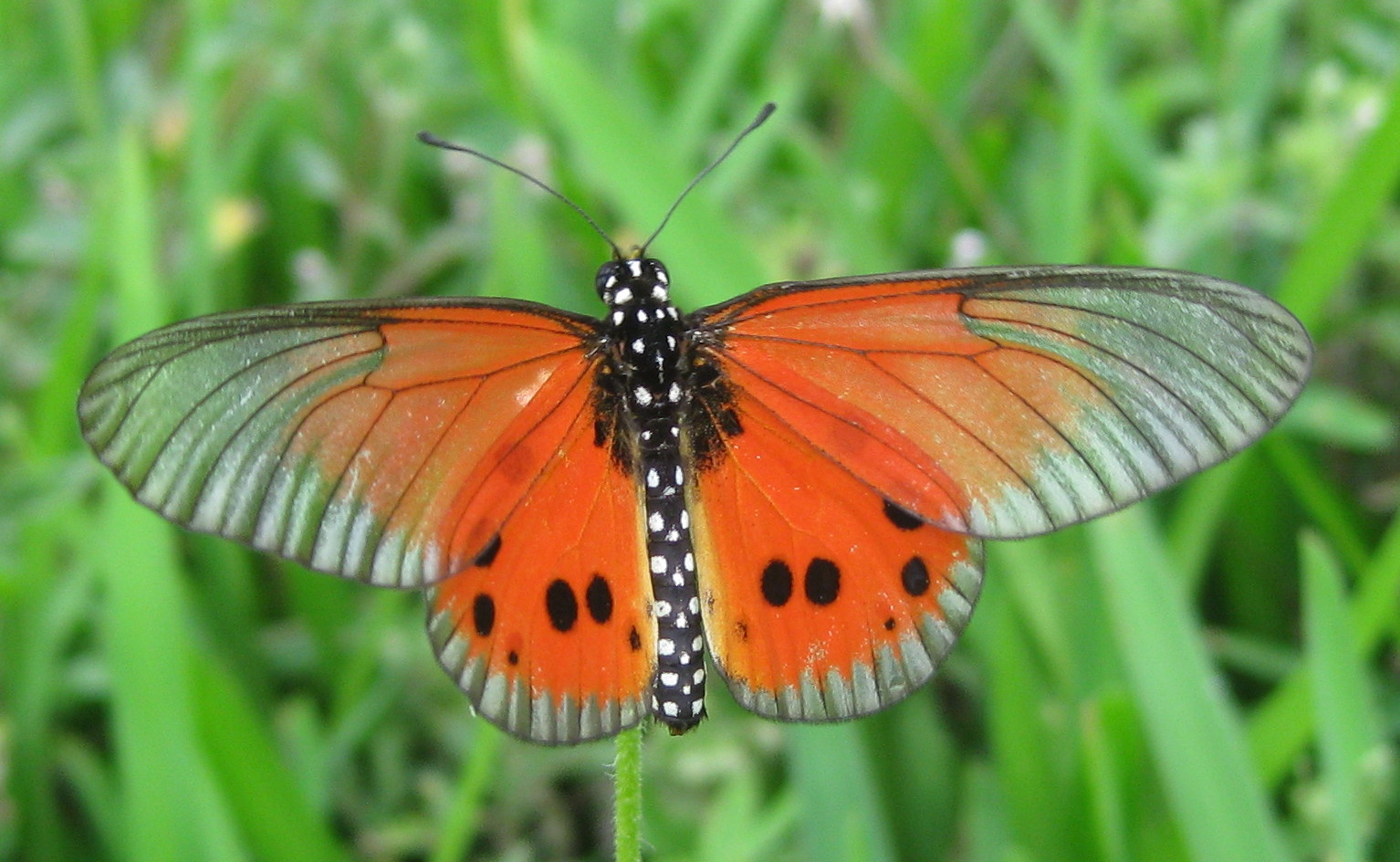
Dusky-veined acraea (A. dammii)

Acraea masamba species group (close to A. circeis?)

- Acraea aubyni – Aubyn Rogers' acraea
- Acraea cinerea – grey acraea
- Acraea fornax
- Acraea igola – dusky-veined acraea
- Acraea masamba
- Acraea quirinalis
- Acraea sambavae
- Acraea siliana
- Acraea simulata (tentatively placed here; Bematistes?)
- Acraea strattipocles

Acraea oberthuri species group (close to A. bonasia group?)

- Acraea althoffi – Althoff's acraea
- Acraea bergeri
- Acraea oberthueri
- Acraea pseudepaea

Acraea pentapolis species group (close to A. circeis and A. masamba groups?)

- Acraea pentapolis – musanga legionnaire
- Acraea vesperalis
- Acraea obeira
- Acraea burni – pale-yellow acraea (close to A. andromacha group?)
- Acraea orestia
- Acraea lia

Acraea pharsalus species group (close to A. encedon and A. jodhutta groups?)

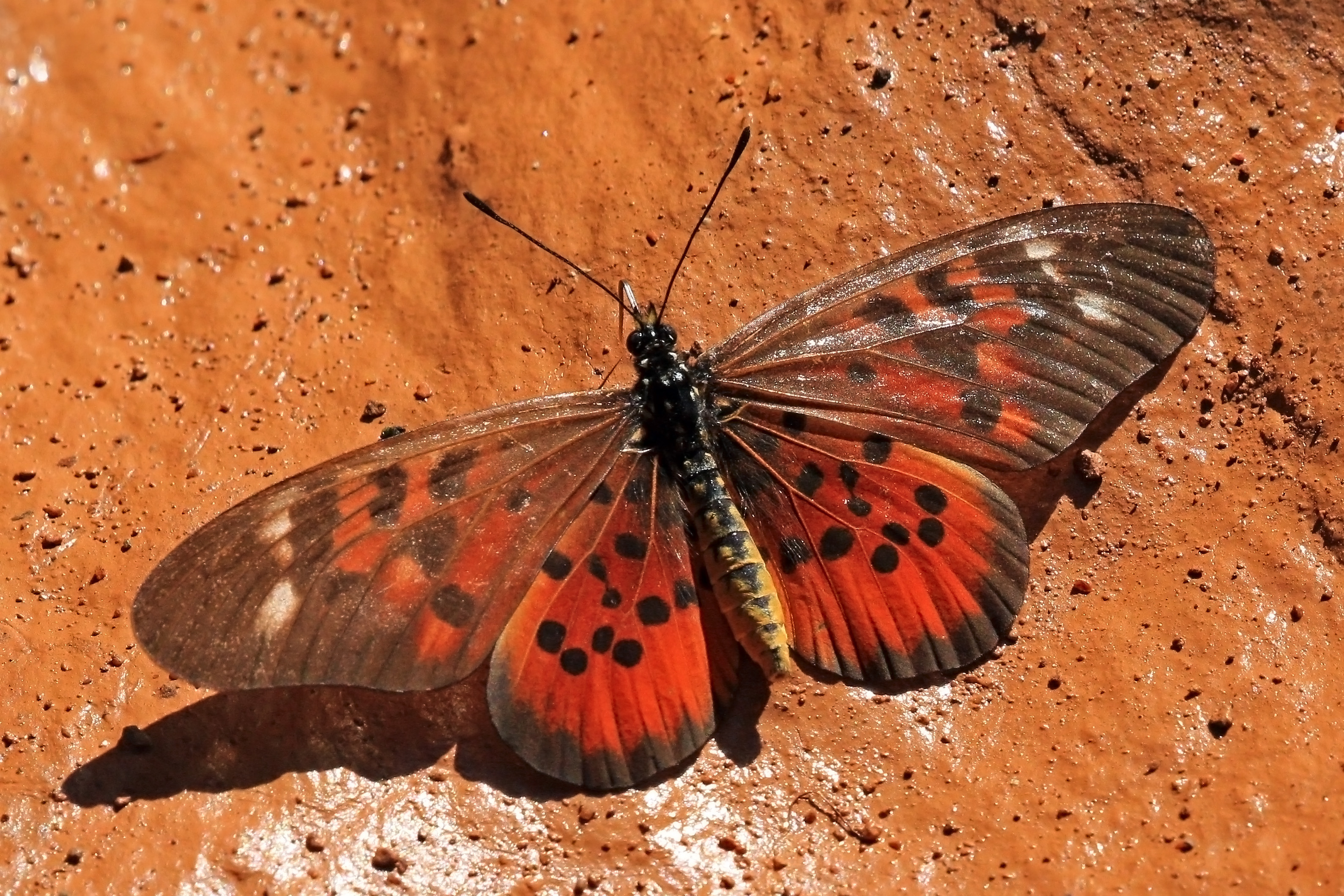
Familiar legionnaire (A. pharsalus)

- Acraea pharsalus – familiar legionnaire
- Acraea vuilloti

Acraea rahira species group (close to A. bonasia group?)

- Acraea anacreon – large orange acraea, orange acraea (type species of Auracraea)
- Acraea anacreontica
- Acraea bomba
- Acraea calida
- Acraea guichardi
- Acraea lusinga
- Acraea induna – induna acraea (included in "Telchinia")
- Acraea kaduna
- Acraea parei
- Acraea alalonga – long-winged orange acraea (included in "Telchinia")
- Acraea mirifica
- Acraea rahira – marsh acraea
- Acraea speciosa
- Acraea wigginsi
- Acraea zitja

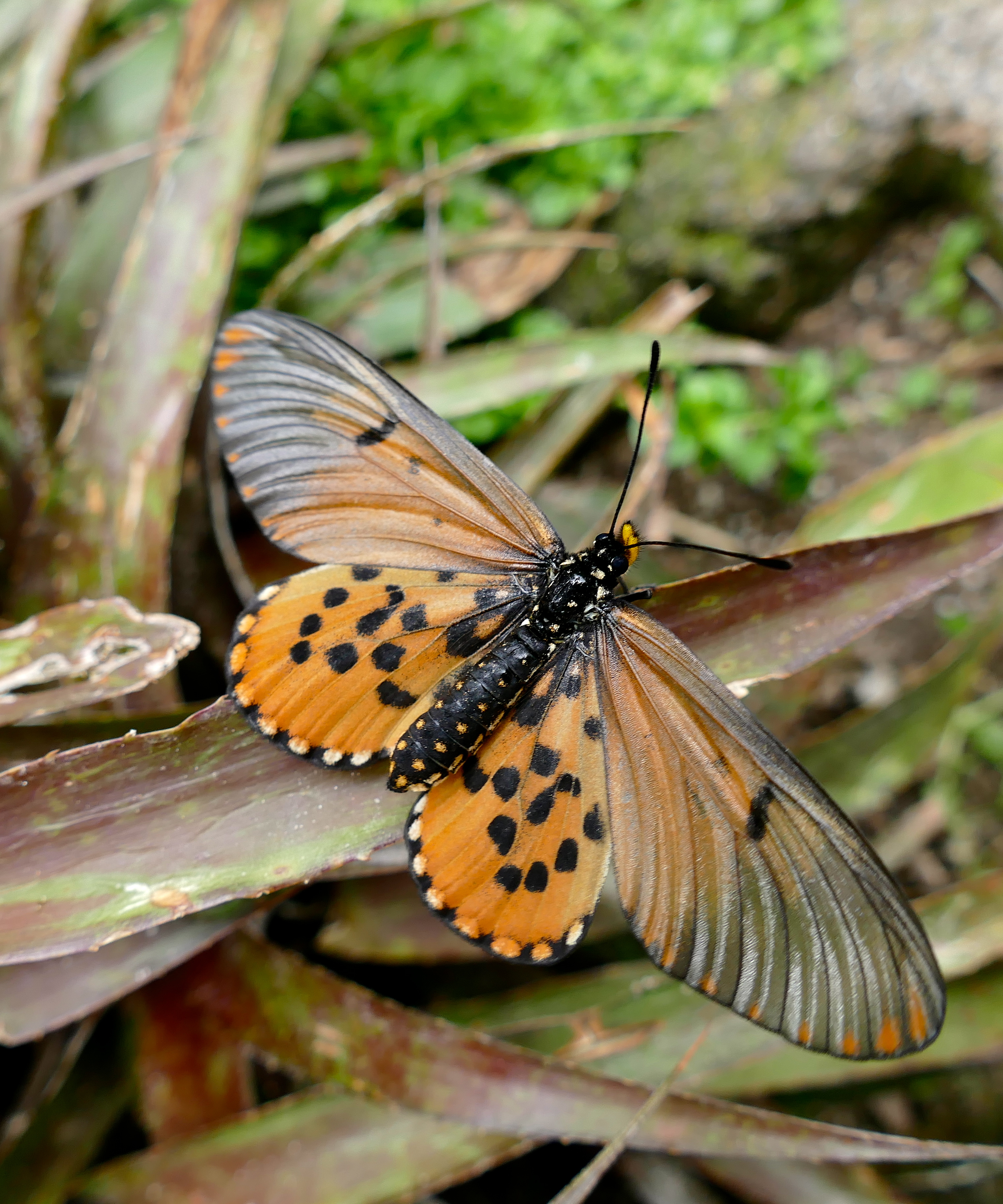
Garden acraea (A. horta, the type species of the genus)

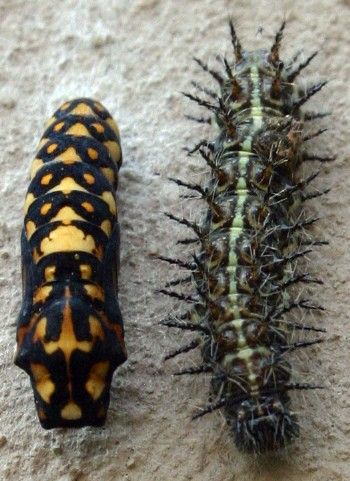
Garden acraea (A. horta) pupa (left) and caterpillar

Acraea satis species group

- Acraea rabbaiae – clear-wing acraea, clearwing legionnaire
- Acraea satis – east coast acraea
- Acraea zonata

A. terpsicore group

- Acraea admatha – Hewitson's glassy legionnaire
- Acraea boopis – rainforest acraea
- Acraea endoscota (close to A. andromacha group?)
- Acraea kappa
- Acraea kia
- Acraea kinduana
- Acraea camaena (close to part of A. andromacha group?)
- Acraea cuva
- Acraea dammii
- Acraea eltringhami
- Acraea eugenia
- Acraea hamata
- Acraea horta – garden acraea (type species of Acraea)
- Acraea hova
- Acraea igati (type species of Solenites)
- Acraea insignis
- Acraea leucographa
- Acraea machequena – machequena acraea
- Acraea mahela
- Acraea matuapa
- Acraea neobule – wandering donkey acraea, wandering donkey (close to A. zetes group?)
- Acraea brainei
- Acraea quirina – common glassy legionnaire (close to A. andromacha group?)
- Acraea ranavalona (type species of Phanopeltis)
- Acraea rileyi
- Acraea rogersi – Rogers's large legionnaire (a rather distinct lineage?)
- Acraea serena – dancing acraea, small orange legionnaire (formerly misidentified as A. eponina, A. terpsicore; type species of Telchinia)

Acraea terpsicore species group (formerly A. violae group)

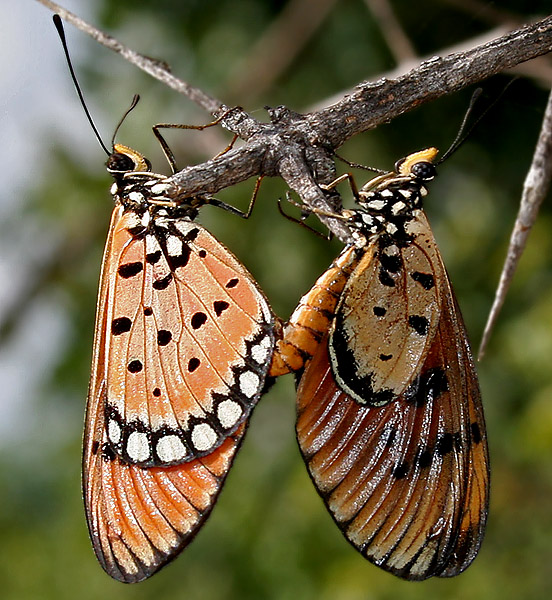
Tawny costers (A. terpsicore) mating

- Acraea terpsicore – tawny coster (formerly A. violae)

Acraea zetes species group (might include part of A. serena group; a very distinct lineage?)

- Acraea acara – acara acraea
- Acraea barberi – Barber's acraea
- Acraea chilo
- Acraea hypoleuca
- Acraea magnifica
- Acraea trimeni – Trimen's acraea
- Acraea zetes

Species group undetermined

- Acraea acutipennis
- Acraea alticola
- Acraea cerasa – tree top acraea
- Acraea ducarmei ("epaea group")
- Acraea humilis
- Acraea kalinzu
- Acraea kraka – kraka glassy acraea
- Acraea macarista
- Acraea mima
- Acraea odzalae
- Acraea omrora
- Acraea oscari
- Acraea overlaeti
- Acraea peetersi
- Acraea polis (close to A. circeis, A. masamba and A. pentapolis groups?)
- Acraea pseudatolmis
- Acraea pullula
- Acraea punctimarginea
- Acraea silia
- Acraea simulator
- Acraea iturina – Ituri glassy acraea
- Acraea toruna
- Acraea turlini
- Acraea viviana
- Acraea zoumi

Some other species formerly in Acraea have now been definitely assigned to other genera, e.g. Bematistes.
