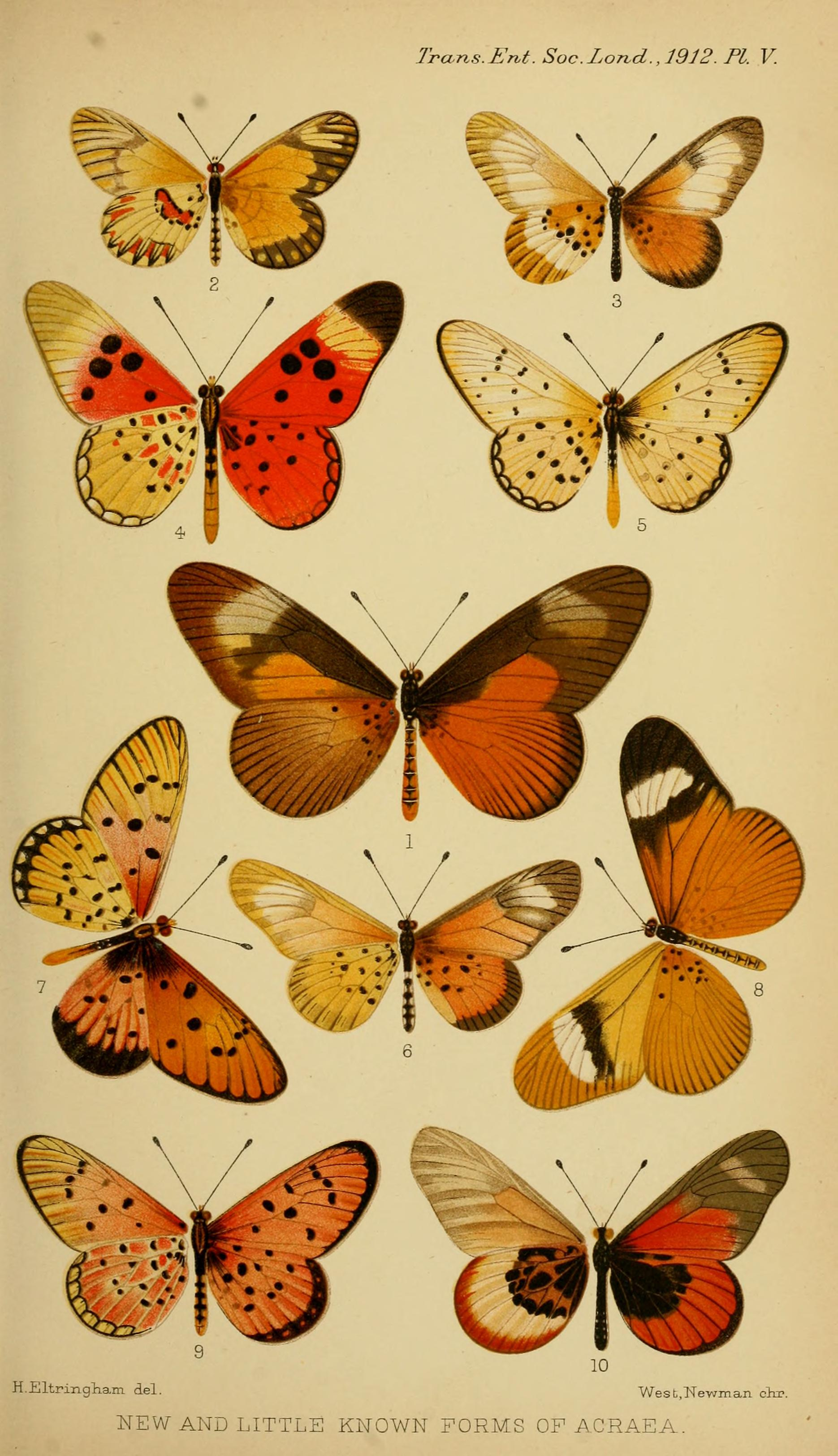
- Figure 6

Scientific classification
- Kingdom: Animalia
- Phylum: Arthropoda
- Class: Insecta
- Order: Lepidoptera
- Family: Nymphalidae
- Genus: Acraea
- Species: A. aubyni

Binomial name
- Acraea aubyni Eltringham, 1912

Synonyms
- Acraea (Actinote) aubyni

= Acraea aubyni =

Species of butterfly

Acraea aubyni, the Aubyn Rogers' acraea, is a butterfly in the family Nymphalidae. It is found along the coast of Kenya and possibly north-eastern Tanzania.

== Description ==
A. aubyni Eltr. (60a). Basal part of the forewing above reddish; the red colour covers the cell to its apex, cellules 1 a to 2 almost to the distal margin and the base of cellule 3; the apical part is blackish with three short whitish transparent spots in 4 to 6. Hindwing above light red nearly to the base with free black dots and a sharply defined black marginal band 2 mm. in breadth; beneath light ochre-yellowish, at the distal margin with short, fine streaks on the folds, which do not quite reach the margin. British East Africa.

== Biology ==
The habitat consists of coastal forests.

== Taxonomy ==
It is a member of the Acraea masamba species group - but see also Pierre & Bernaud, 2014
