= Acraea bergeriana =

Scientific classification
- Kingdom: Animalia
- Phylum: Arthropoda
- Class: Insecta
- Order: Lepidoptera
- Family: Nymphalidae
- Genus: Acraea
- Species: A. bergeriana

Binomial name
- Acraea bergeriana Pierre, 1979

Synonyms
- Acraea cepheus bergeriana Pierre, 1979; Acraea (Acraea) bergeriana; Acraea cepheus f. bergeri Pierre, 1976

Species of butterfly

Acraea bergeriana is a butterfly in the family Nymphalidae. It is found in Tanzania.

== Biology ==
The habitat consists of forests at altitudes ranging from 350 to 2,140 meters.

Adults are attracted to flowers.

== Taxonomy ==
It is a member of the Acraea cepheus species group. See also Pierre & Bernaud, 2014.
