= Acraea punctimarginea =

Scientific classification
- Kingdom: Animalia
- Phylum: Arthropoda
- Class: Insecta
- Order: Lepidoptera
- Family: Nymphalidae
- Genus: Acraea
- Species: A. punctimarginea

Binomial name
- Acraea punctimarginea Pinhey, 1956

Synonyms
- Acraea (Acraea) punctimarginea

Species of butterfly

Acraea punctimarginea is a butterfly in the family Nymphalidae. It is found in Tanzania, from the north-eastern part of the country to the Uluguru and Usambara mountains. For taxonomy see Pierre & Bernaud, 2014
