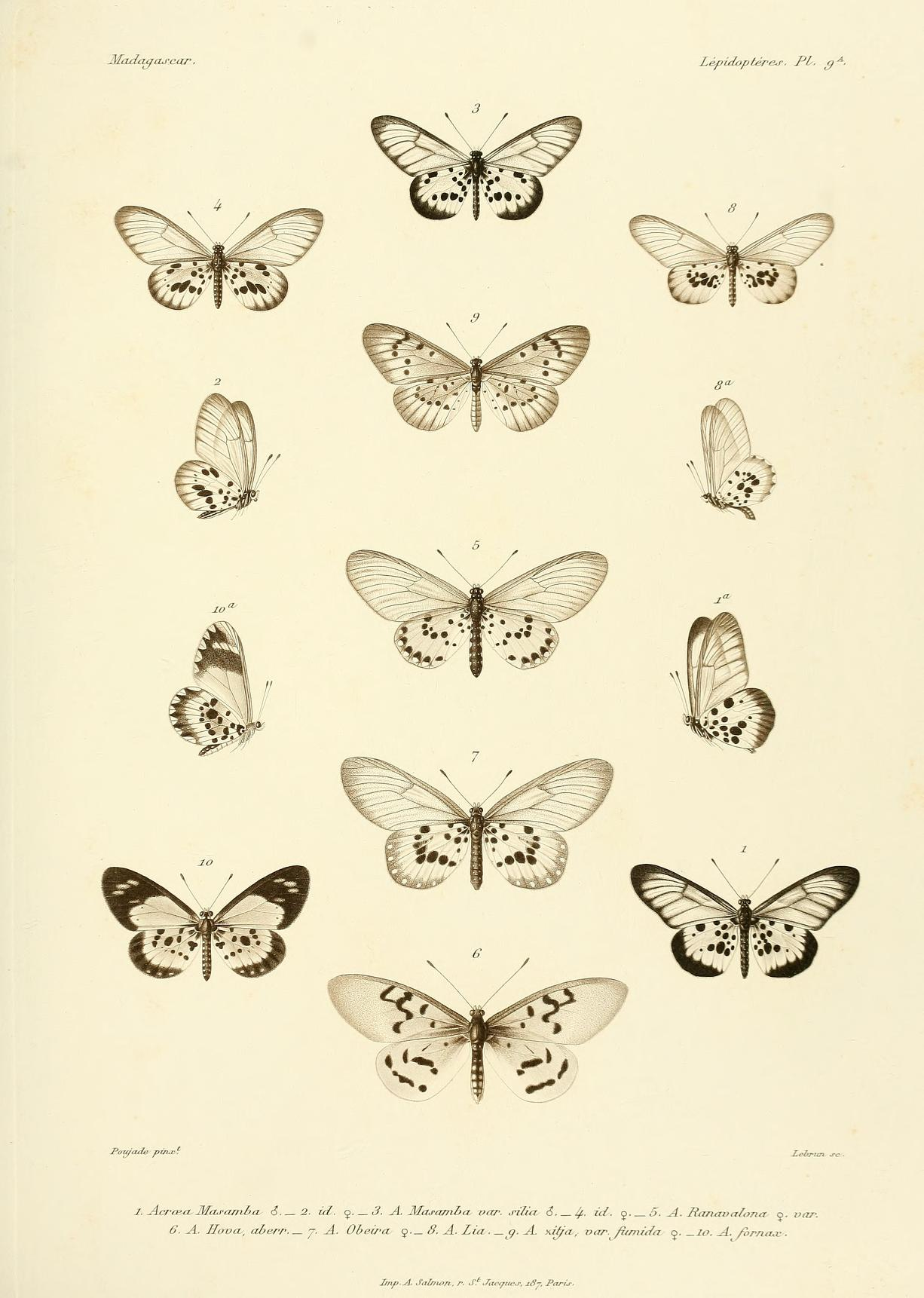

Scientific classification
- Kingdom: Animalia
- Phylum: Arthropoda
- Class: Insecta
- Order: Lepidoptera
- Family: Nymphalidae
- Genus: Acraea
- Species: A. fornax

Binomial name
- Acraea fornax Butler, 1879

Synonyms
- Acraea (Actinote) fornax; Acraea smithi Mabille, 1880; Acraea fornax var. blachieri Oberthür, 1916

= Acraea fornax =

Species of butterfly

Acraea fornax is a butterfly in the family Nymphalidae. It is found on Madagascar.

== Description ==
A. fornax Btlr. (55 g) may be easily known by having the basal part of the forewing as far as the apex of the cell brick-red without spots and then black (male) or black-grey (female) with three small whitish semitransparent spots in 4 to 6; the black colour is continued at the costal margin to the base and is more or less transparent, especially in the female; the marginal spots are entirely absent above but are large and red-brown beneath. Hindwing above brick-red with large, free black basal and discal dots and black, proximally somewhat dentate marginal band, in which in the male the marginal spots are absent or only distinct in 1 c to 3, but in the female all large and dull red-yellow; beneath the hindwing is somewhat scaled with smoky brown in the basal area as far as the discal spots and has then a whitish median band of uniform breadth and a black marginal band with triangular red-yellow marginal spots. Madagascar.

== Biology ==
The habitat consists of forests.

== Taxonomy ==
It is a member of the Acraea masamba species group - but see also Pierre & Bernaud, 2014
