= Acraea parei =

Scientific classification
- Kingdom: Animalia
- Phylum: Arthropoda
- Class: Insecta
- Order: Lepidoptera
- Family: Nymphalidae
- Genus: Acraea
- Species: A. parei

Binomial name
- Acraea parei (Henning & Henning, 1996)

Synonyms
- Hyalites parei Henning & Henning, 1996; Acraea (Actinote) parei; Hyalites parei orangica Henning & Henning, 1996

Species of butterfly

Acraea parei is a butterfly in the family Nymphalidae. It is found in Zimbabwe, Malawi and Zambia. The habitat consists of montane grassland.

Adults have been recorded in April, October, November and December.

== Subspecies ==
- Acraea parei parei (Zimbabwe: Chimanimani Mountains)
- Acraea parei orangica (Henning & Henning, 1996) (the Nyika Plateau in Malawi and Zambia)

== Taxonomy ==
It is a member of the Acraea rahira species group- but see also Pierre & Bernaud, 2014
