= Acraea atatis =

Scientific classification
- Kingdom: Animalia
- Phylum: Arthropoda
- Class: Insecta
- Order: Lepidoptera
- Family: Nymphalidae
- Genus: Acraea
- Species: A. atatis

Binomial name
- Acraea atatis Pierre, 2004

Species of butterfly

Acraea atatis is a butterfly in the family Nymphalidae. It is found in the Central African Republic.

== Taxonomy ==
See Pierre & Bernaud, 2014
