= Acraea overlaeti =

Scientific classification
- Kingdom: Animalia
- Phylum: Arthropoda
- Class: Insecta
- Order: Lepidoptera
- Family: Nymphalidae
- Genus: Acraea
- Species: A. overlaeti

Binomial name
- Acraea overlaeti Pierre, 1988

Synonyms
- Acraea (Acraea) overlaeti

Species of butterfly

Acraea overlaeti is a butterfly in the family Nymphalidae. It is found in the Democratic Republic of the Congo (Shaba). See Pierre & Bernaud, 2014 for taxonomy.
