= Acraea kaduna =

Scientific classification
- Kingdom: Animalia
- Phylum: Arthropoda
- Clade: Pancrustacea
- Class: Insecta
- Order: Lepidoptera
- Family: Nymphalidae
- Genus: Acraea
- Species: A. kaduna

Binomial name
- Acraea kaduna Pierre, 1993

Synonyms
- Acraea (Actinote) kaduna

Species of butterfly

Acraea kaduna, the Kaduna acraea, is a species of butterfly in the family Nymphalidae. It is found in Nigeria. The habitat consists of flood plains and swamps around Kaduna and Zaria.

== Taxonomy ==
It is a member of the Acraea rahira species group. See also Pierre & Bernaud, 2014.
