= Acraea annonae =

Scientific classification
- Kingdom: Animalia
- Phylum: Arthropoda
- Class: Insecta
- Order: Lepidoptera
- Family: Nymphalidae
- Genus: Acraea
- Species: A. annonae

Binomial name
- Acraea annonae Pierre, 1987

Synonyms
- Acraea (Acraea) annonae; Acraea lualabae f. kapiriensis Schouteden, 1927

Species of butterfly

Acraea annonae is a butterfly in the family Nymphalidae. It is found in the Democratic Republic of the Congo (Shaba).

== Taxonomy ==
It is a member of the Acraea acrita species group.

Other views

- Acraea (group acrita) Henning, 1993
- Acraea (subgenus Rubraea) Henning & Williams, 2010
- Acraea (Acraea) (subgroup acrita) Pierre & Bernaud, 2013
- Acraea (Acraea) Groupe egina Pierre & Bernaud, 2014
