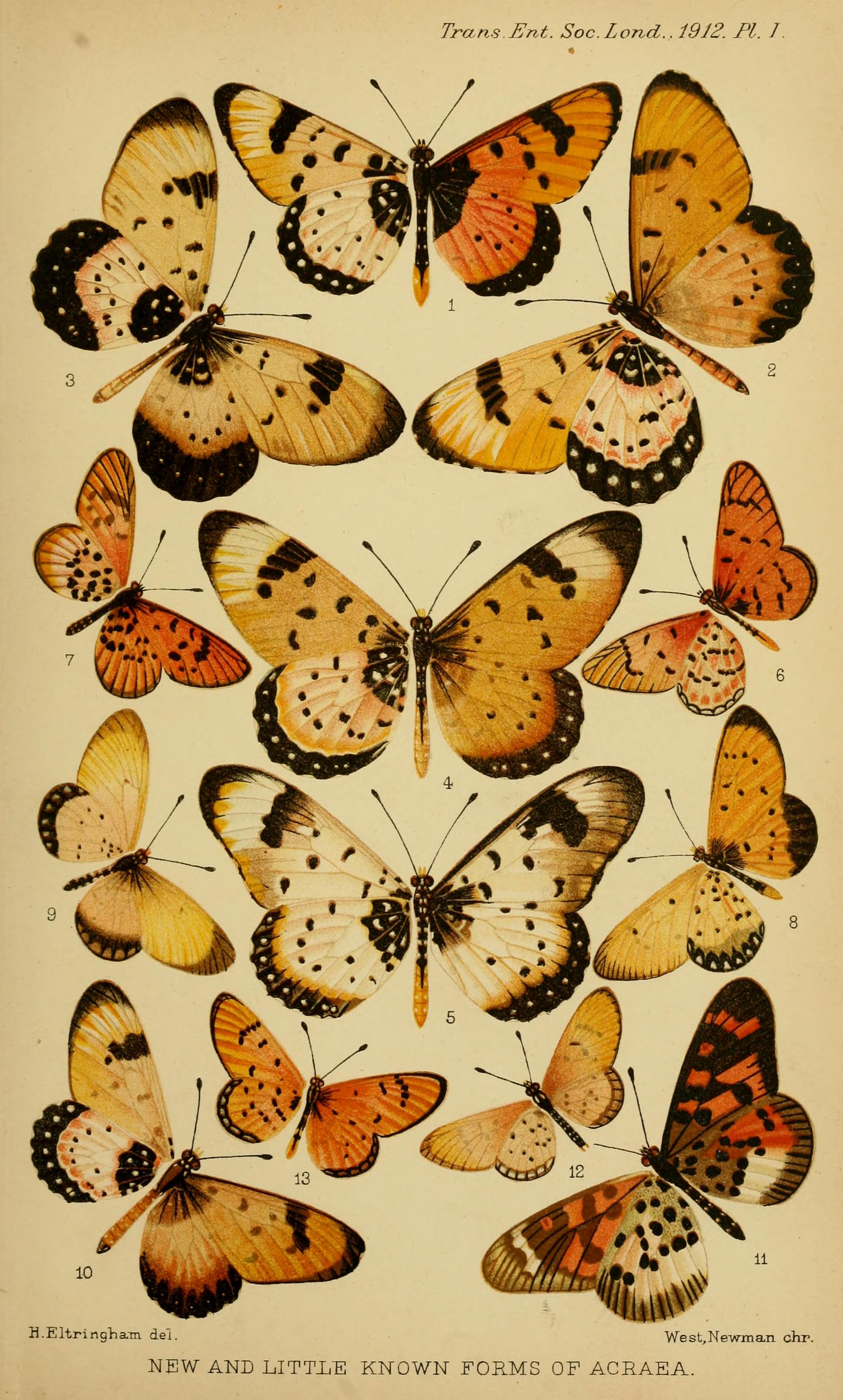
- Figures 8 and 9

Scientific classification
- Kingdom: Animalia
- Phylum: Arthropoda
- Class: Insecta
- Order: Lepidoptera
- Family: Nymphalidae
- Genus: Acraea
- Species: A. lofua

Binomial name
- Acraea lofua Eltringham, 1911

Synonyms
- Acraea (Acraea) lofua

= Acraea lofua =

Species of butterfly

Acraea lofua is a butterfly in the family Nymphalidae. It is found in north-eastern Zambia.

== Description ==
A. lofua Eltr. (60 e). male. Wings above reddish ochre-yellow, at the base narrowly scaled with black and with the usual black dots; fore wing with black marginal band, which is gradually widened at the apex into a spot 3 mm. in breadth, beneath lighter but otherwise almost as above; hind wing above with very broad unspotted, deep black marginal band, which is broader in the middle, beneath with light yellow ground-colour and white marginal spots. The female differs in having the forewing light ochre-yellowish without black discal dots and the hindwing light reddish grey-yellow; the basal and discal dots are very small and the marginal band somewhat narrower than in the male and with grey marginal spots above also. Rhodesia, on the Lofu River.

== Biology ==
The habitat consists of deciduous woodland.

== Taxonomy ==
It is a member of the Acraea cepheus species group. See also Pierre & Bernaud, 2014.
