= Acraea ducarmei =

Scientific classification
- Kingdom: Animalia
- Phylum: Arthropoda
- Class: Insecta
- Order: Lepidoptera
- Family: Nymphalidae
- Genus: Acraea
- Species: A. ducarmei

Binomial name
- Acraea ducarmei Bernaud & Pierre 2012

Species of butterfly

Acraea ducarmei is a butterfly in the family Nymphalidae. It is found in the Democratic Republic of the Congo (Kivu and Biakato).See Pierre & Bernaud, 2014 for taxonomy.
