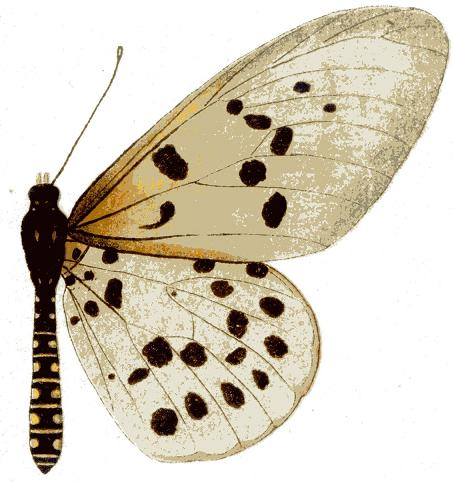
- Female
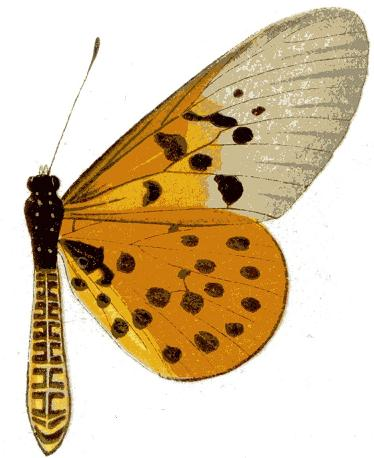
- Male

Scientific classification
- Kingdom: Animalia
- Phylum: Arthropoda
- Class: Insecta
- Order: Lepidoptera
- Family: Nymphalidae
- Genus: Acraea
- Species: A. hova

Binomial name
- Acraea hova Boisduval, 1833

Synonyms
- Acraea (Acraea) hova

= Acraea hova =

Species of butterfly

Acraea hova is a butterfly in the family Nymphalidae. It is found on Madagascar.

== Description ==
A. hova Bdv. (53 c) is a large and beautiful species, characterized by the hindwing having a complete row of submarginal dots and very small or even indistinct marginal spots at the extremities of the veins, while the basal dots are placed close to the base and are widely separated from the discal dots; the forewing has usually large and distinct discal dots in (la) lb to 6, a basal dot in 1 b, a dot in the cell and a transverse spot at the end of the cell. Forewing above at least to the discal dots brick-red, then hyaline, occasionally in the female almost entirely hyaline; hindwing above red, at the inner margin yellowish or sometimes in the female yellowish white. Madagascar.

== Biology ==
The habitat consists of forests.

== Taxonomy ==
It is a member of the Acraea terpsicore species group- but see also Pierre & Bernaud, 2014

- Acraea (group admatha) hova Henning, 1993, Metamorphosis 4 (1): 11
- Acraea (Acraea) (subgroup admantha) hova Pierre & Bernaud, 2013, Butterflies of the World 39: 4, pl. 15, f. 11-12
