= Acraea zoumi =

Scientific classification
- Kingdom: Animalia
- Phylum: Arthropoda
- Class: Insecta
- Order: Lepidoptera
- Family: Nymphalidae
- Genus: Acraea
- Species: A. zoumi

Binomial name
- Acraea zoumi Pierre, 1995

Synonyms
- Acraea (Acraea) zoumi

Species of butterfly

Acraea zoumi is a butterfly in the family Nymphalidae. It is found in Ethiopia. For taxonomy see Pierre & Bernaud, 2014
