= Acraea kia =

Scientific classification
- Kingdom: Animalia
- Phylum: Arthropoda
- Class: Insecta
- Order: Lepidoptera
- Family: Nymphalidae
- Genus: Acraea
- Species: A. kia

Binomial name
- Acraea kia Pierre, 1990

Synonyms
- Acraea (Acraea) kia

Species of butterfly

Acraea kia is a butterfly in the family Nymphalidae. It is found in Tanzania, from the western part of the country to the Kigoma Region.

== Taxonomy ==
It is a member of the Acraea terpsicore species group - but see also Pierre & Bernaud, 2014
