= Acraea lapidorum =

Scientific classification
- Kingdom: Animalia
- Phylum: Arthropoda
- Clade: Pancrustacea
- Class: Insecta
- Order: Lepidoptera
- Family: Nymphalidae
- Genus: Acraea
- Species: A. lapidorum

Binomial name
- Acraea lapidorum Pierre, 1988

Synonyms
- Acraea (Acraea) lapidorum

Species of butterfly

Acraea lapidorum is a species of butterfly in the family Nymphalidae. It is found in Angola.

== Taxonomy ==
It is a member of the Acraea cepheus species group. See also Pierre & Bernaud, 2014.
