= Acraea bailundensis =

Scientific classification
- Kingdom: Animalia
- Phylum: Arthropoda
- Clade: Pancrustacea
- Class: Insecta
- Order: Lepidoptera
- Family: Nymphalidae
- Genus: Acraea
- Species: A. bailundensis

Binomial name
- Acraea bailundensis Wichgraf, 1918

Synonyms
- Acraea (Acraea) bailundensis; Acraea schoutedeni Overlaet, 1954

Species of butterfly

Acraea bailundensis is a species of butterfly in the family Nymphalidae. It is found in Angola and the Democratic Republic of the Congo (Lualaba).

== Taxonomy ==
It is a member of the Acraea cepheus species group. See also Pierre & Bernaud, 2014.
