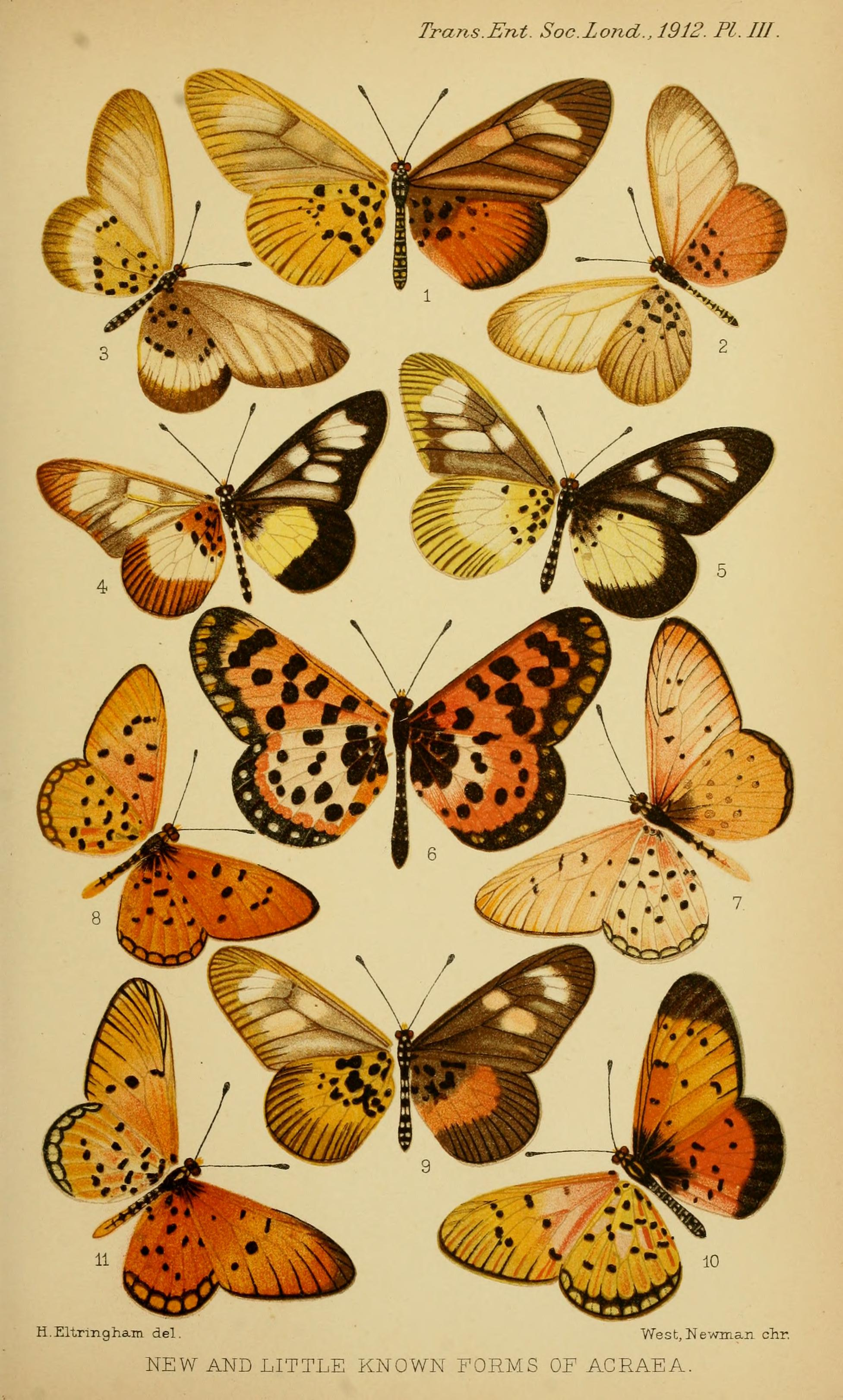
- Figure 6

Scientific classification
- Kingdom: Animalia
- Phylum: Arthropoda
- Class: Insecta
- Order: Lepidoptera
- Family: Nymphalidae
- Genus: Acraea
- Species: A. oscari

Binomial name
- Acraea oscari Rothschild, 1902

Synonyms
- Acraea (Acraea) oscari

= Acraea oscari =

Species of butterfly

Acraea oscari is a butterfly in the family Nymphalidae. It is found in Ethiopia.

== Description ==
A. oscari Rothsch. (60 d). Wings above dull red with black marginal band of uniform breadth, on the fore wing 5 mm. and enclosing large yellowish marginal spots, on the hind wing only 3 mm. and indistinctly spotted; forewing broad and rounded, above but little black at the base; hindwing above deep black at the base as far as vein 2 and then whitish to the apex of the cell; the black spots of both wings very large and arranged quite as in chilo wings beneath almost as above, but the hindwing broadly whitish in the middle. In the female the ground-colour is brownish white. Abyssinia.

== Taxonomy ==
See Pierre & Bernaud, 2014
