= Acraea encoda =

Scientific classification
- Kingdom: Animalia
- Phylum: Arthropoda
- Class: Insecta
- Order: Lepidoptera
- Family: Nymphalidae
- Genus: Acraea
- Species: A. encoda

Binomial name
- Acraea encoda Pierre, 1981

Synonyms
- Acraea (Actinote) encoda

Species of butterfly

Acraea encoda is a butterfly in the family Nymphalidae. It is found in Gabon and the Democratic Republic of the Congo.

== Biology ==
The larvae feed on Commelina species.

== Taxonomy ==
It is a member of the Acraea encedon species group- but see also Pierre & Bernaud, 2014
