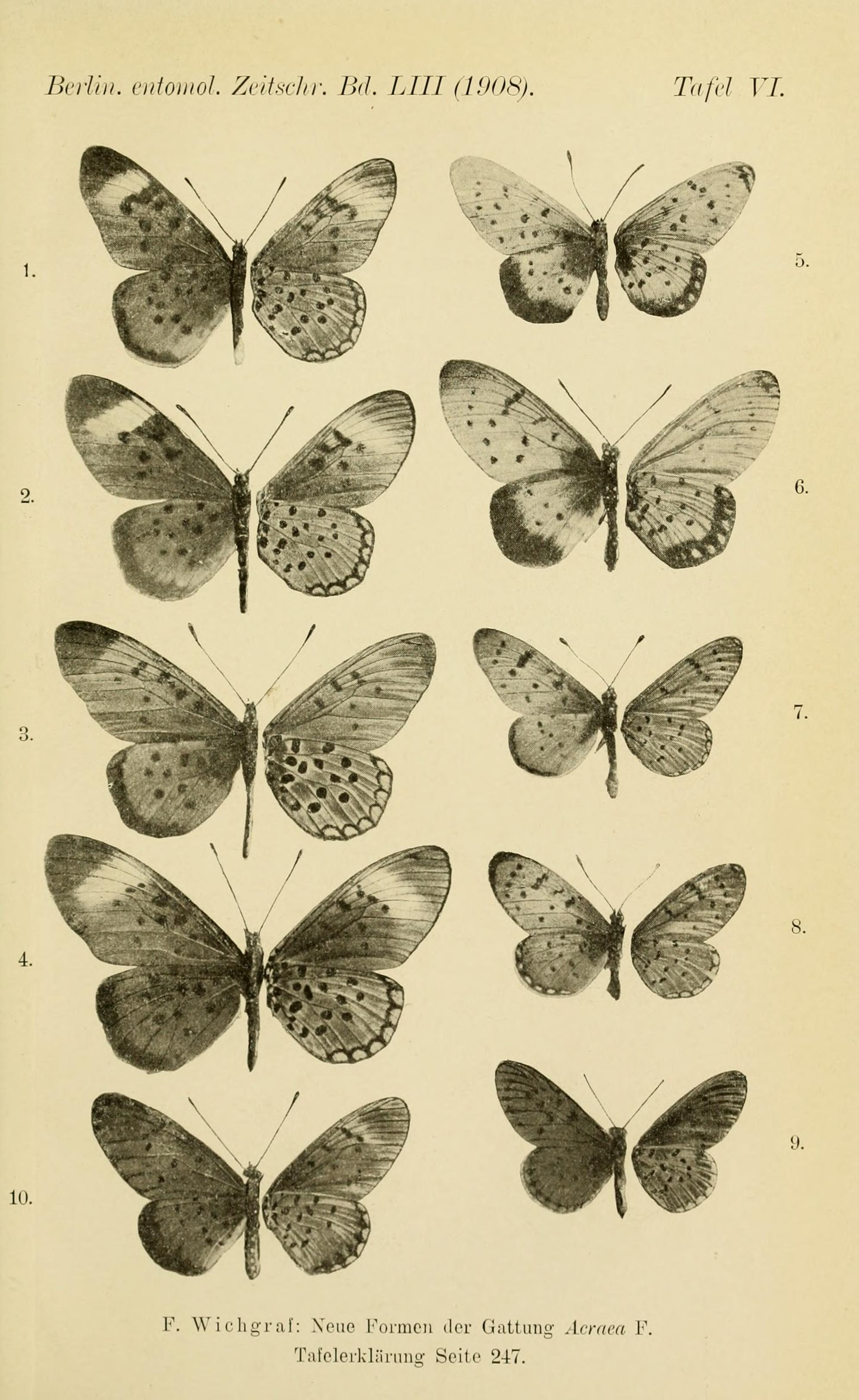
- Figures 3 and 4

Scientific classification
- Kingdom: Animalia
- Phylum: Arthropoda
- Class: Insecta
- Order: Lepidoptera
- Family: Nymphalidae
- Genus: Acraea
- Species: A. intermediodes

Binomial name
- Acraea intermediodes Ackery, 1995

Synonyms
- Acraea (Acraea) intermediodes; Acraea intermedia Wichgraf, 1909

= Acraea intermediodes =

Species of butterfly

Acraea intermediodes is a butterfly in the family Nymphalidae. It is found in the Democratic Republic of the Congo (Haut-Lomani, Kabinda, Lualaba) and north-eastern Zambia.

== Description ==
A. intermedia Wichgr. entirely agrees with the type-form of caldarena except that discal dots 4 and 5 of the forewing are placed nearer to the apex of the cell than to the black apical spot and that the female has a broad white subapical band on the forewing. Rhodesia and southern Congo.

== Taxonomy ==
It is a member of the Acraea caecilia species group. See also Pierre & Bernaud, 2014.
