= Acraea kinduana =

Scientific classification
- Kingdom: Animalia
- Phylum: Arthropoda
- Class: Insecta
- Order: Lepidoptera
- Family: Nymphalidae
- Genus: Acraea
- Species: A. kinduana

Binomial name
- Acraea kinduana Pierre, 1979

Synonyms
- Acraea (Acraea) kinduana; Acraea admatha ab. kinduana Schouteden, 1919

Species of butterfly

Acraea kinduana is a butterfly in the family Nymphalidae. It is found in the Democratic Republic of the Congo (Kivu and Maniema).

== Taxonomy ==
It is a member of the Acraea terpsicore species group - but see also Pierre & Bernaud, 2014
