= Acraea turlini =

Scientific classification
- Kingdom: Animalia
- Phylum: Arthropoda
- Class: Insecta
- Order: Lepidoptera
- Family: Nymphalidae
- Genus: Acraea
- Species: A. turlini

Binomial name
- Acraea turlini Pierre, 1979

Synonyms
- Acraea (Acraea) turlini

Species of butterfly

Acraea turlini is a butterfly in the family Nymphalidae. It is found in Rwanda. For taxonomy see Pierre & Bernaud, 2014
