= Acraea hecqui =

Scientific classification
- Kingdom: Animalia
- Phylum: Arthropoda
- Class: Insecta
- Order: Lepidoptera
- Family: Nymphalidae
- Genus: Acraea
- Species: A. hecqui

Binomial name
- Acraea hecqui Berger, 1981

Synonyms
- Acraea (Actinote) hecqui

Species of butterfly

Acraea hecqui is a butterfly in the family Nymphalidae. It is found in the Democratic Republic of the Congo (southern Kivu).
