= Acraea alalonga =

Long-winged orange acraea

Scientific classification
- Kingdom: Animalia
- Phylum: Arthropoda
- Class: Insecta
- Order: Lepidoptera
- Family: Nymphalidae
- Genus: Acraea
- Species: A. alalonga

Binomial name
- Acraea alalonga (Henning & Henning, 1996)

Synonyms
- Actinote alalonga Henning & Henning, 1996; Hyalites alalonga (Henning & Henning, 1996); Telchinia alalonga Henning & Henning, 1996

Species of butterfly

Acraea alalonga, the long-winged orange acraea, is a butterfly of the family Nymphalidae. It is found in montane grassland from the Drakensberg and midlands in KwaZulu-Natal, north into Mpumalanga and the Wolkberg in Limpopo.

The wingspan is 54–74 mm for males and 58–74 mm for females. Adults are on wing from November to January (with a peak in December) and from March to May (with a peak in April). There are two generations per year.

The larvae feed on Fabaceae species, including Aeschynomene species.

== Taxonomy ==
It is a member of the Acraea rahira species group- but see also Pierre & Bernaud, 2014
