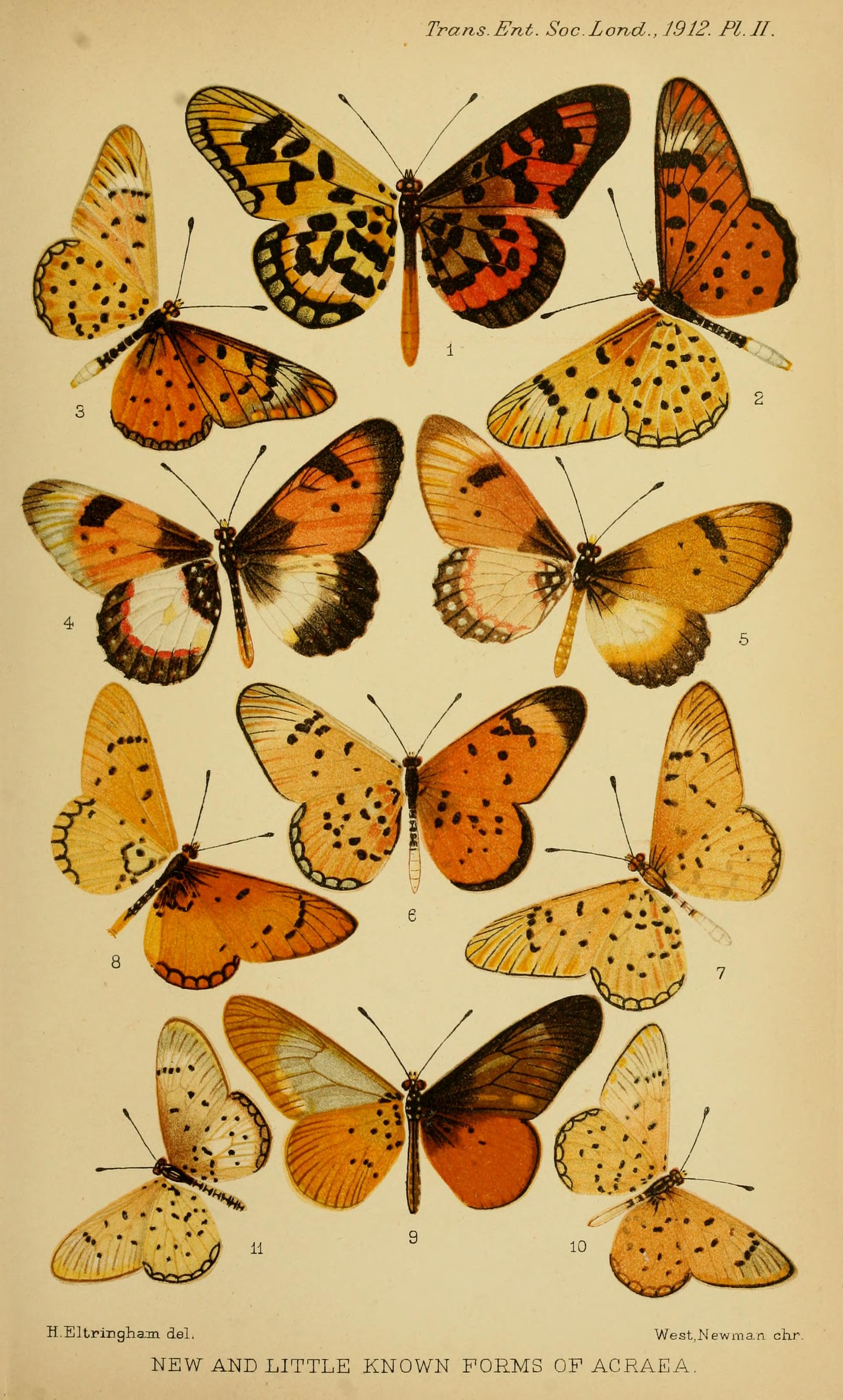
- Figure 8

Scientific classification
- Kingdom: Animalia
- Phylum: Arthropoda
- Class: Insecta
- Order: Lepidoptera
- Family: Nymphalidae
- Genus: Acraea
- Species: A. onerata

Binomial name
- Acraea onerata Trimen, 1891

Synonyms
- Acraea (Acraea) onerata; Acraea aureola Eltringham, 1911

= Acraea onerata =

Eriksson's acraea

Species of butterfly

Acraea onerata, the Eriksson's acraea, is a butterfly in the family Nymphalidae. It is found in Angola.

== Description ==
A. aureola Eltr. (60 c) is a rare species, only one specimen (from Angola) being yet known. The wings are bright orange-yellow above, at the base a little darkened; forewing with a black dot in the cell, the usual discal dots, the one in 1 b placed very near to the distal margin and those in cellules 3 to 6 forming a shallow curve, and a fine dark marginal band, which is not widened at the apex; the veins at the distal margin finely black and somewhat widened. Hindwing above and beneath with large marginal spots, which are of the ground colour and are bounded by black lunules; the discal dots of cellules 2 to 5 entirely absent, but there is a dot near to the marginal band in 6 and another in the middle of cellule 7; the underside of the hindwing is lighter, at the base in 1 a to 1 c and the cell ochre-yellow; this basal area scarcely reaches vein 2, is distally bounded in the cell and 1 c by a thick black streak and encloses a black dot in the cell. A. onerata Trim, seems from the figure to be nearly allied to aureola and has the marginal band on the hindwing and the basal area on its under surface quite similar, but differs in its smaller size (expanse about 45 mm.), in having discal spots in cellules 2, 4 and 5 of the hindwing and in the more irregularly arranged discal dots in cellules 3 to 6 of the fore wing. Damaraland.

== Biology ==
Adults are on wing in December.

== Taxonomy ==
It is the single member of the Acraea onerata species group.

Classification of Acraea by Henning, Henning & Williams, Pierre. J. & Bernaud

- Acraea (group nohara) Henning, 1993
- Acraea (Acraea) (subgroup nohara) Pierre & Bernaud, 2013
- Acraea (Rubraea) Henning & Williams, 2010
- Acraea (Acraea) Groupe egina Pierre & Bernaud, 2014
