= Acraea peetersi =

Scientific classification
- Kingdom: Animalia
- Phylum: Arthropoda
- Class: Insecta
- Order: Lepidoptera
- Family: Nymphalidae
- Genus: Acraea
- Species: A. peetersi

Binomial name
- Acraea peetersi Pierre, 1992

Species of butterfly

Acraea peetersi is a butterfly in the family Nymphalidae. It is found in the Central African Republic. - but see also Pierre & Bernaud, 2014 for taxonomy.
