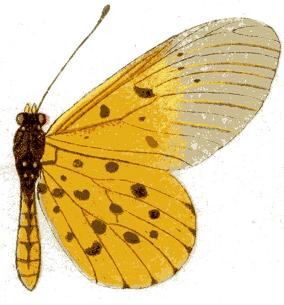

Scientific classification
- Kingdom: Animalia
- Phylum: Arthropoda
- Class: Insecta
- Order: Lepidoptera
- Family: Nymphalidae
- Genus: Acraea
- Species: A. mahela

Binomial name
- Acraea mahela Boisduval, 1833

Synonyms
- Acraea (Acraea) mahela

= Acraea mahela =

Species of butterfly

Acraea mahela is a butterfly in the family Nymphalidae. It is found on Madagascar.

== Description ==
A. mahela Bdv. (53 c). Both wings thinly scaled, with light ochre-yellow ground-colour; fore wing diaphanous in the distal part as far as the discal dots and with distinct discal dots in 1 b to 6, a transverse streak at the end of the cell and a dot in the cell; hindwing with free basal and discal dots and small black spots at the distal margin on the extremities of the veins, both surfaces quite similarly coloured and marked. The sexes are quite similar. Madagascar.

== Biology ==
The habitat consists of transformed grasslands and anthropogenic environments.

== Taxonomy ==
It is a member of the Acraea terpsicore species group - but see also Pierre & Bernaud, 2014

- Acraea (group horta) mahela Henning, 1993, Metamorphosis 4 (1): 8
- Acraea (Acraea) (subgroup horta) mahela; Pierre & Bernaud, 2013, Butterflies of the World 39: 6, pl. 18, f. 5-6
