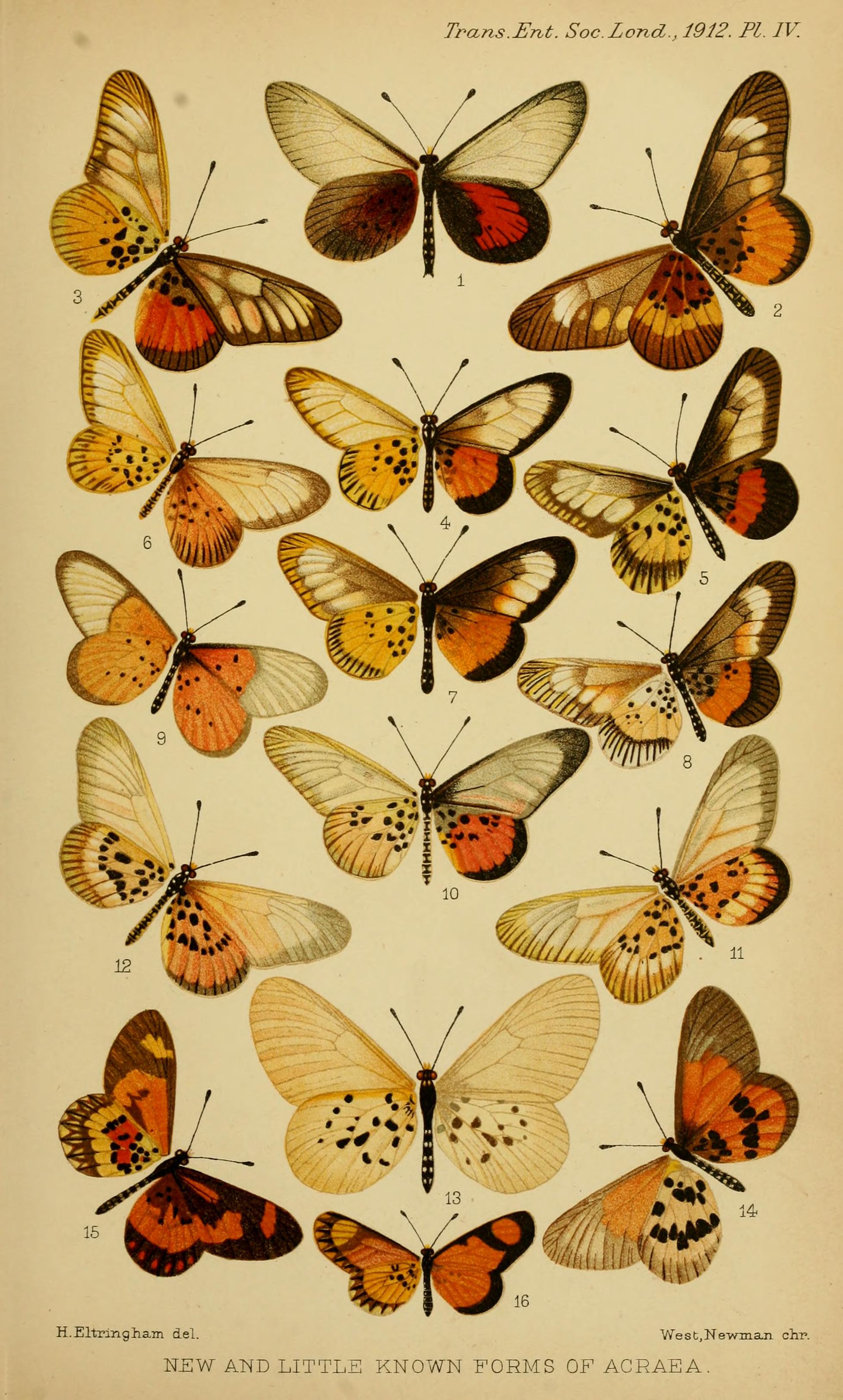
- Figure 16 holotype

Scientific classification
- Kingdom: Animalia
- Phylum: Arthropoda
- Class: Insecta
- Order: Lepidoptera
- Family: Nymphalidae
- Genus: Acraea
- Species: A. lumiri

Binomial name
- Acraea lumiri Bethune-Baker, 1908

Synonyms
- Acraea (Actinote) lumiri; Acraea lumiri var. camerunica Strand, 1914

= Acraea lumiri =

Species of butterfly

Acraea lumiri is a butterfly in the family Nymphalidae. It is found from Cameroon to the central part of the Democratic Republic of the Congo.

== Description ==
A. lumiri Baker (60 g). Wings above with orange-red markings; subapical band of the forewing broad and rounded; the hindmarginal spot is very large, reaches the base of cellules 1 a to 2, almost entirely covers the cell and also forms a small spot in cellule 3; the hindwing above almost to the base orange-red with uniform marginal band 2 mm. in breadth and occasionally with some black basal dots. Hindwing beneath yellow with black basa1 and discal dots but without red spots in the basal area and with uniformly curved black marginal band, which encloses large whitish grey marginal spots. Expanse about 34 mm. Cameroons and Congo.

== Taxonomy ==
Acraea lumiri is a member of the Acraea bonasia species group; see Acraea.

See also Pierre & Bernaud, 2014
