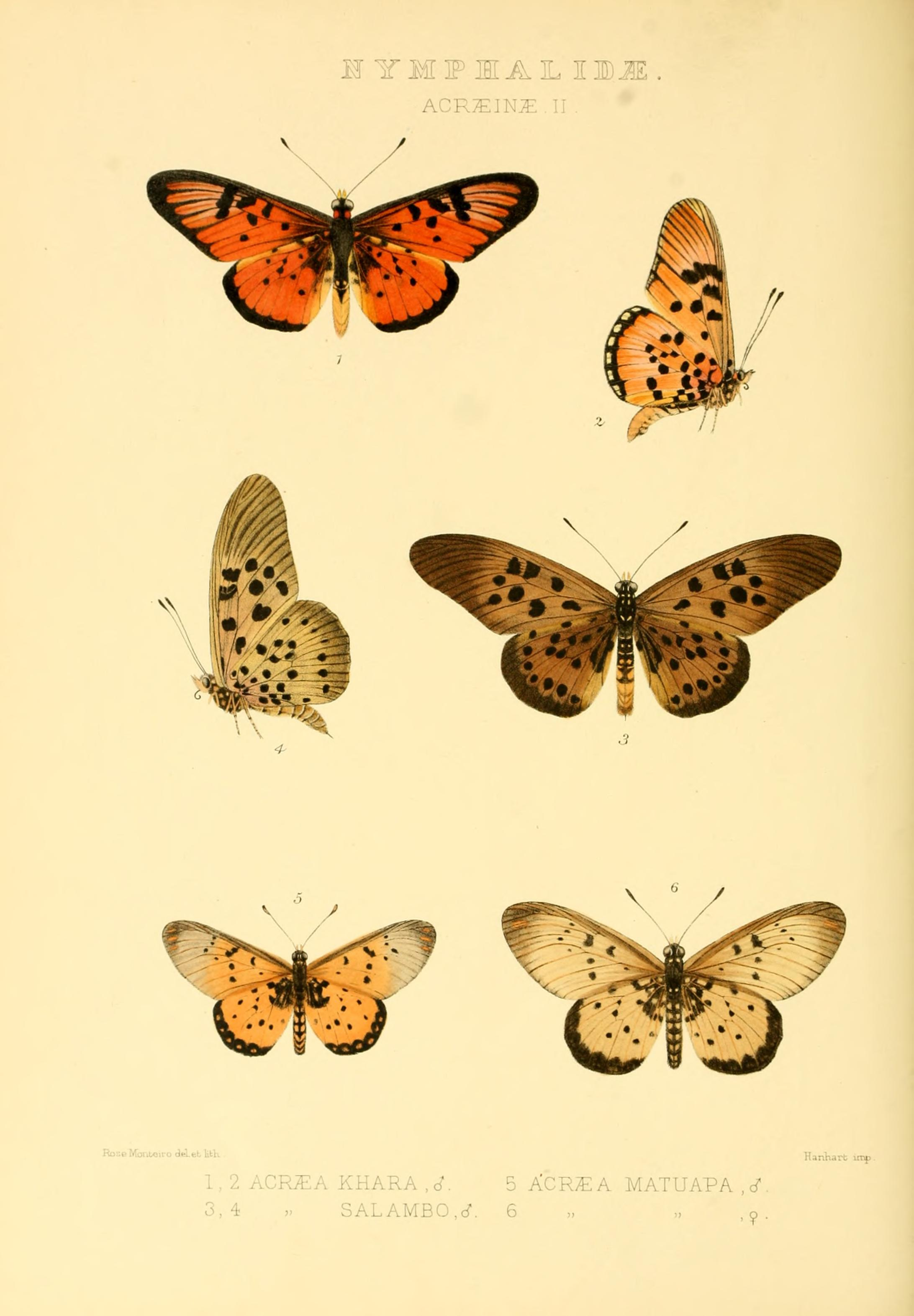
- Figures 5 and 6

Scientific classification
- Domain: Eukaryota
- Kingdom: Animalia
- Phylum: Arthropoda
- Class: Insecta
- Order: Lepidoptera
- Family: Nymphalidae
- Genus: Acraea
- Species: A. matuapa

Binomial name
- Acraea matuapa Grose-Smith, 1889

Synonyms
- Acraea (Acraea) matuapa

= Acraea matuapa =

Species of butterfly

Acraea matuapa is a butterfly in the family Nymphalidae. It is found in Kenya, in the eastern part of the country and along the coast. The habitat consists of grassy areas in and around coastal forests.
