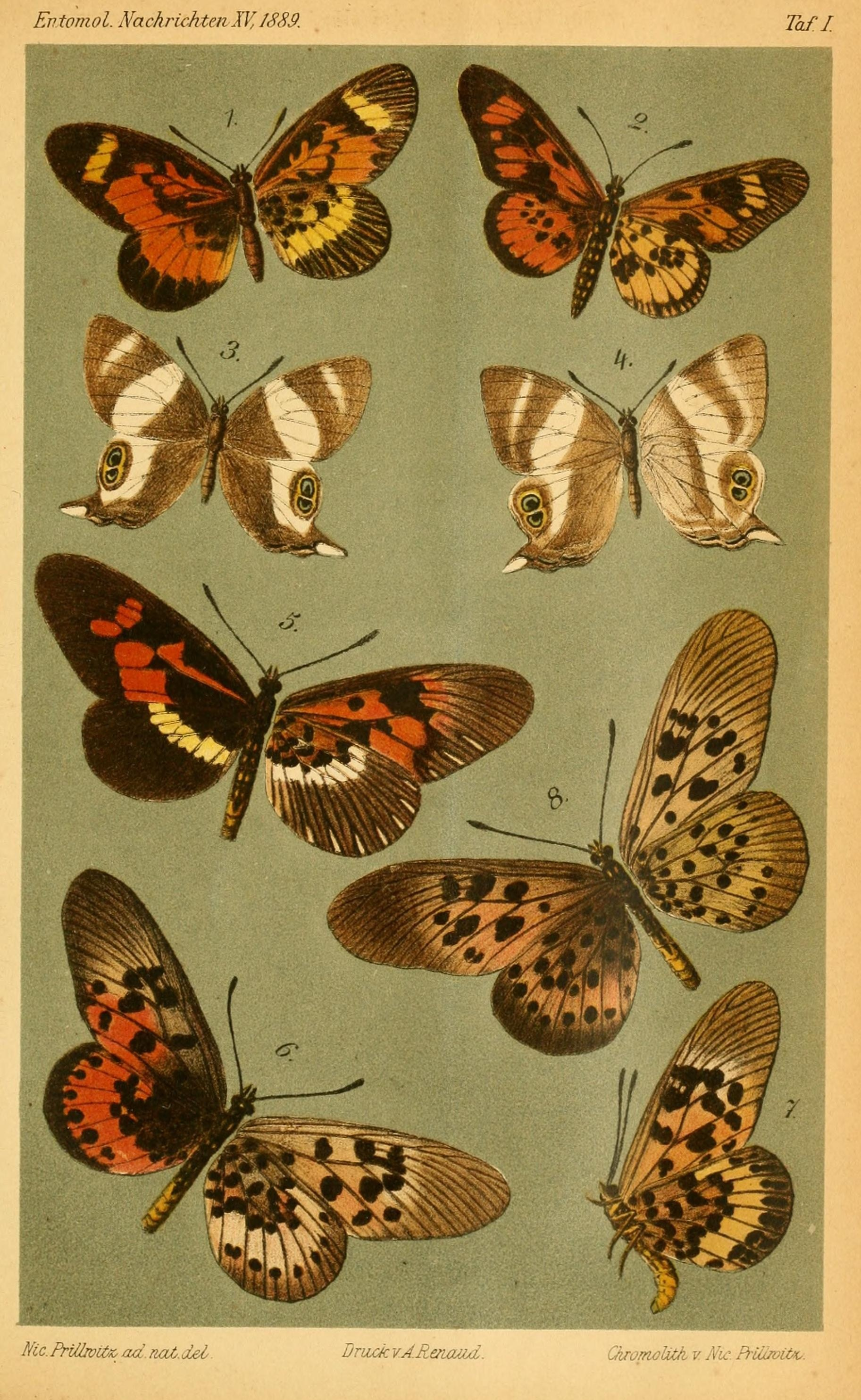
- Figure 2

Scientific classification
- Kingdom: Animalia
- Phylum: Arthropoda
- Class: Insecta
- Order: Lepidoptera
- Family: Nymphalidae
- Genus: Acraea
- Species: A. buschbecki

Binomial name
- Acraea buschbecki Dewitz, 1889

Synonyms
- Acraea (Actinote) buschbecki; Acraea zaire Rogenhofer, 1890; Telchinia zaire

= Acraea buschbecki =

Species of butterfly

Acraea buschbecki is a butterfly in the family Nymphalidae. It is found from Cameroon to the western, central and southern parts of the Democratic Republic of the Congo.

== Description ==
A. buschbecki Dew. (57 a). Forewing black above, with the same red spots as in orina, but with the stripe in 1 b divided by a black spot in the middle and the cell with an elongate black spot; the spot in 3 is small and placed in or behind the middle of the cellule; under surface as above, but spots 3-6 yellow instead of red and the marginal band striped with yellow. Hindwing above red to the base with black dots, or somewhat darkened at the base, at the distal margin with sharply defined marginal band about 2 mm. in breadth, beneath with yellow ground-colour and black marginal band, which encloses two small yellow dots in each cellule. Cameroons to the Congo; rare.

== Taxonomy ==
It is a member of the Acraea circeis species group- but see also Pierre & Bernaud, 2014
