= Acraea odzalae =

Scientific classification
- Kingdom: Animalia
- Phylum: Arthropoda
- Class: Insecta
- Order: Lepidoptera
- Family: Nymphalidae
- Genus: Acraea
- Species: A. odzalae

Binomial name
- Acraea odzalae Collins, 1980

Species of butterfly

Acraea odzalae is a butterfly in the family Nymphalidae. It is found in the Republic of the Congo. For taxonomy see Pierre & Bernaud, 2014
