= Acraea guichardi =

Scientific classification
- Kingdom: Animalia
- Phylum: Arthropoda
- Class: Insecta
- Order: Lepidoptera
- Family: Nymphalidae
- Genus: Acraea
- Species: A. guichardi

Binomial name
- Acraea guichardi Gabriel, 1949

Synonyms
- Acraea (Actinote) guichardi

Species of butterfly

Acraea guichardi is a butterfly in the family Nymphalidae. It is found in Ethiopia.

== Taxonomy ==
It is a member of the Acraea rahira species group- but see also Pierre & Bernaud, 2014
