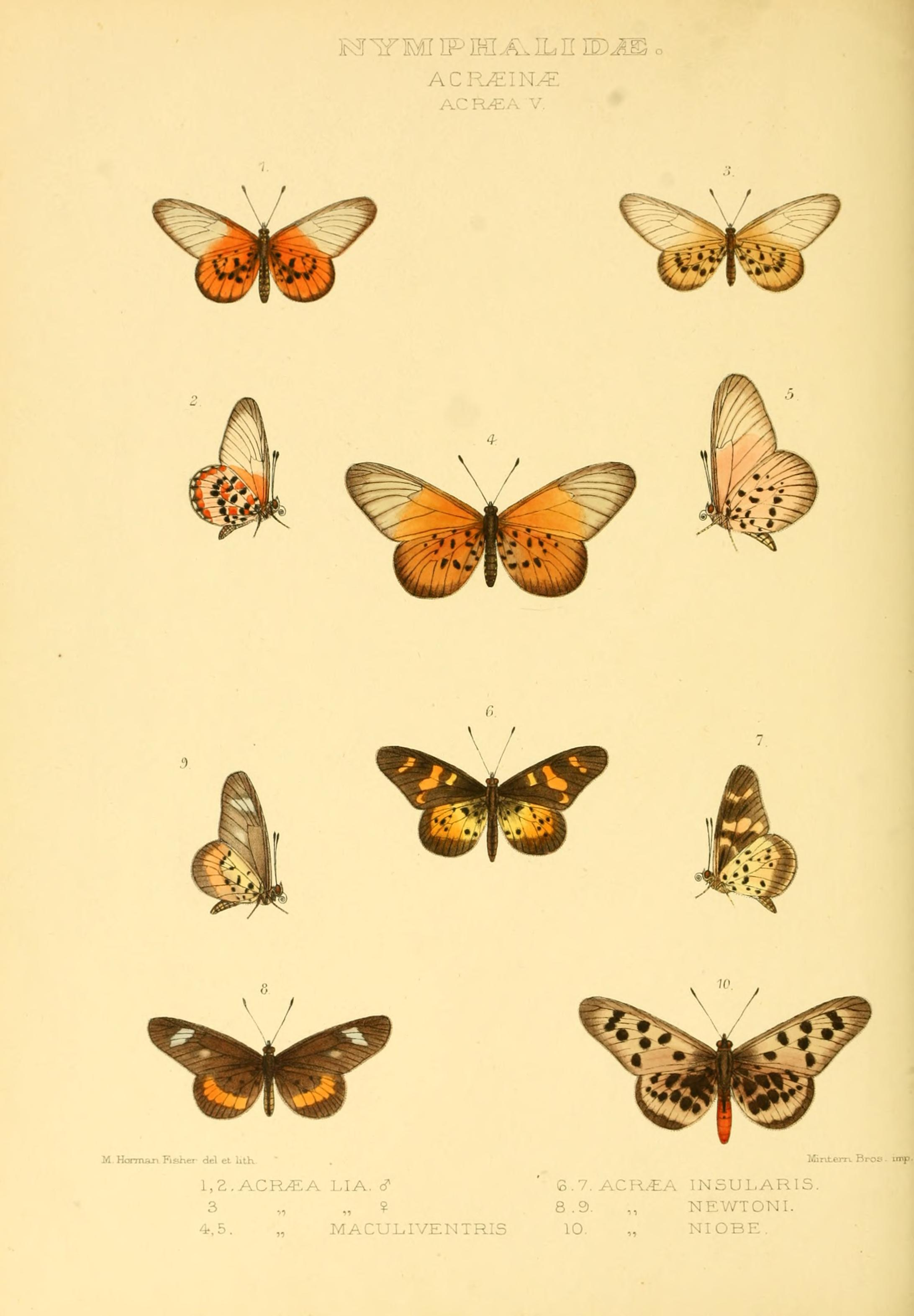
- Figures 8 and 9

Scientific classification
- Kingdom: Animalia
- Phylum: Arthropoda
- Class: Insecta
- Order: Lepidoptera
- Family: Nymphalidae
- Genus: Acraea
- Species: A. newtoni

Binomial name
- Acraea newtoni Sharpe, 1893

Synonyms
- Acraea (Actinote) newtoni

= Acraea newtoni =

Species of butterfly

Acraea newtoni is a butterfly in the family Nymphalidae. It is found on São Tomé Island.

== Description ==
A. newtoni E. Sharpe. Forewing blackish with a rounded whitish spot in 2 and a whitish subapical band in 4-6; hindwing blackish above, just beyond the apex of the cell with a red-yellow median band, of a uniform breadth of 3 mm., which does not quite reach the inner margin, beneath greenish light grey with black dots as far as the apex of the cell, otherwise as above. Island of Sao Thome; only one male known.

== Taxonomy ==
It is a member of the Acraea circeis species group - but see also Pierre & Bernaud, 2014
