= Acraea burgessi =

Scientific classification
- Kingdom: Animalia
- Phylum: Arthropoda
- Class: Insecta
- Order: Lepidoptera
- Family: Nymphalidae
- Genus: Acraea
- Species: A. burgessi

Binomial name
- Acraea burgessi Jackson, 1956

Synonyms
- Acraea (Actinote) burgessi

Species of butterfly

Acraea burgessi is a butterfly in the family Nymphalidae. It is found in Uganda (Kigezi) and the Democratic Republic of the Congo (northern Kivu).

== Taxonomy ==
Acraea burgessi is a member of the Acraea bonasia species group; see Acraea.

Classification of Acraea by Henning, Henning & Williams, Pierre. J. & Bernaud

- Hyalites (group bonasia) Henning, 1993
- Acraea (Actinote) (subgroup bonasia) Pierre & Bernaud, 2013
- Telchinia (Telchinia) Henning & Williams, 2010
- Acraea (Actinote) groupe serena sub group bonasia Pierre & Bernaud, 2014
