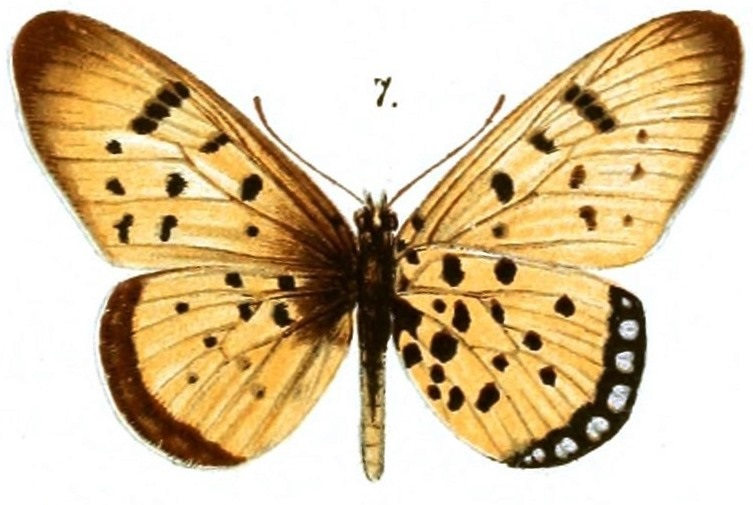

Scientific classification
- Kingdom: Animalia
- Phylum: Arthropoda
- Class: Insecta
- Order: Lepidoptera
- Family: Nymphalidae
- Genus: Acraea
- Species: A. marnois

Binomial name
- Acraea marnois Rogenhofer, 1890

Synonyms
- Acraea (Acraea) marnois; Telchinia marnois

= Acraea marnois =

Species of butterfly

Acraea marnois is a butterfly in the family Nymphalidae. It is found in Sudan.

== Description ==
A. marnois Rog., which I formerly incorrectly regarded as a form of oncaea, is, as Eltringham has discovered, very nearly allied to Acraea caecilia and probably only a form of it. Wings above sand-yellow; at the base narrowly blackish; the black colour does not reach vein 2; at the apex and distal margin narrowly darkened, but much more broadly than in caecilia pudora; basal and discal dots on both wings as in caecilia. Soudan.

== Taxonomy ==
It is a member of the Acraea caecilia species group. See also Pierre & Bernaud, 2014. Junior synonym of Acraea caecilia.
