= Acraea alticola =

Scientific classification
- Kingdom: Animalia
- Phylum: Arthropoda
- Class: Insecta
- Order: Lepidoptera
- Family: Nymphalidae
- Genus: Acraea
- Species: A. alticola

Binomial name
- Acraea alticola Schultze, 1923

Synonyms
- Acraea (Actinote) alticola; Acraea mairessei ab. nyongana Strand, 1914; Acraea ntebiae nyongana d’Abrera, 1980

Species of butterfly

Acraea alticola, the Schultze's acraea, is a butterfly in the family Nymphalidae. It is found in Nigeria and Cameroon. The habitat consists of sub-montane forests. See Pierre & Bernaud, 2014 for taxonomy
