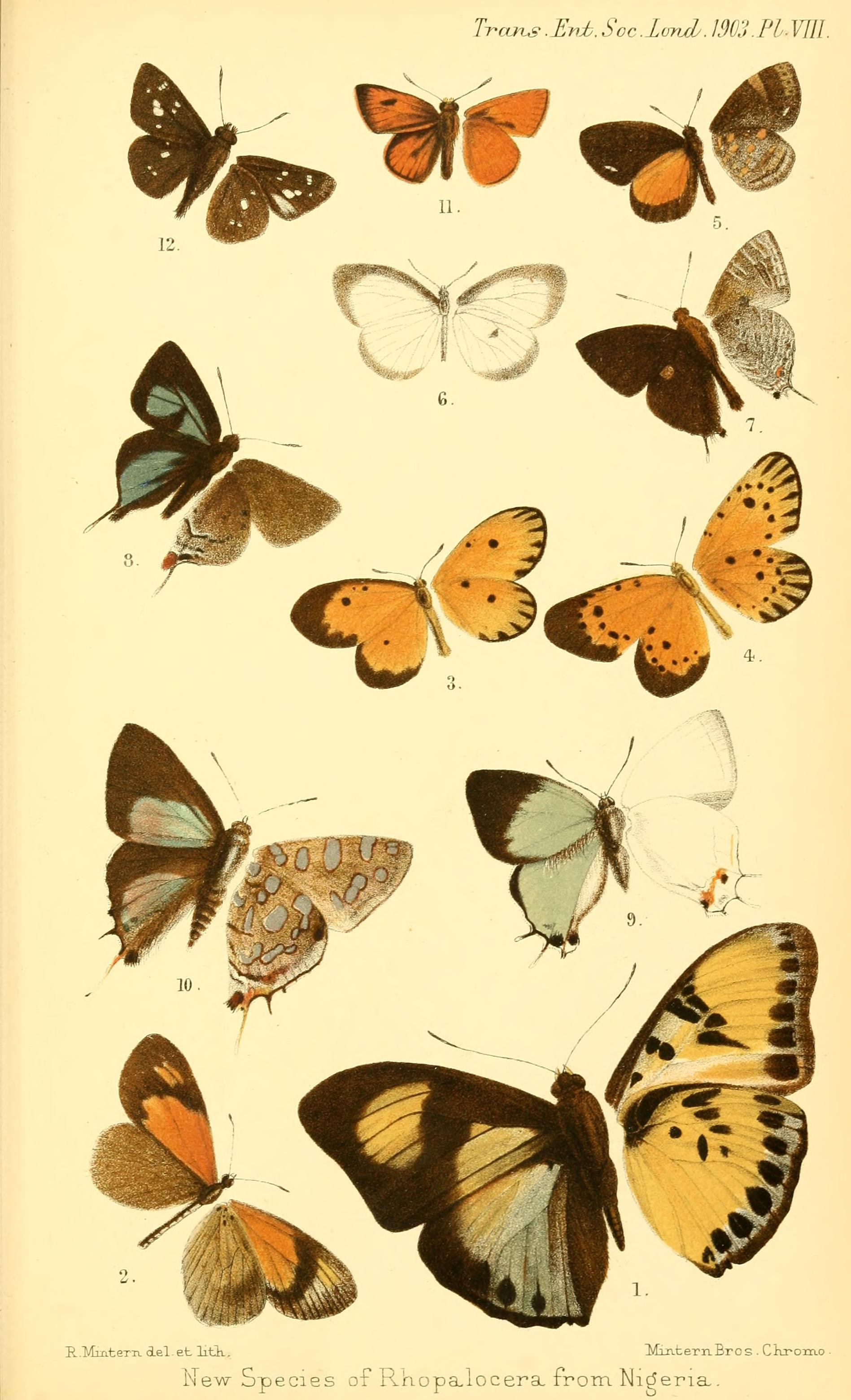
- Figure 2

Scientific classification
- Kingdom: Animalia
- Phylum: Arthropoda
- Class: Insecta
- Order: Lepidoptera
- Family: Nymphalidae
- Genus: Acraea
- Species: A. actinotina

Binomial name
- Acraea actinotina (Lathy, 1903)

Synonyms
- Telipna actinotina Lathy, 1903; Acraea (Actinote) actinotina

= Acraea actinotina =

Puzzling acraea

Species of butterfly

Acraea actinotina, the puzzling acraea, is a butterfly in the family Nymphalidae. It is found in central and eastern Nigeria. The describer, Percy Ireland Lathy, mistakenly placed this species in Telipna Lycaenidae - the wrong family. Hence the English name puzzling acraea.

== Description ==
Forewing on both surfaces in the basal part orange-yellow as far as the costal margin and vein 4, in the apical part above black with two elongate yellow subapical spots in 5 and 6, beneath black-grey with indistinct light subapical spots in 3-6 and broad black bordering to the yellow basal part. Hindwing brown-grey beneath with some small black basal dots.

== Taxonomy ==
It is a member of the Acraea jodutta species group- but see also Pierre & Bernaud, 2014
