= Acraea rileyi =

Scientific classification
- Kingdom: Animalia
- Phylum: Arthropoda
- Class: Insecta
- Order: Lepidoptera
- Family: Nymphalidae
- Genus: Acraea
- Species: A. rileyi

Binomial name
- Acraea rileyi Le Doux, 1931

Synonyms
- Acraea (Actinote) rileyi

Species of butterfly

Acraea rileyi is a butterfly in the family Nymphalidae. It is found in the Democratic Republic of the Congo.

== Taxonomy ==
It is a member of the Acraea terpsicore species group - but see also Pierre & Bernaud, 2014
