= Acraea lusinga =

Scientific classification
- Kingdom: Animalia
- Phylum: Arthropoda
- Class: Insecta
- Order: Lepidoptera
- Family: Nymphalidae
- Genus: Acraea
- Species: A. lusinga

Binomial name
- Acraea lusinga Overlaet, 1955

Synonyms
- Acraea (Actinote) lusinga; Acraea anacreon lusinga

Species of butterfly

Acraea lusinga is a butterfly in the family Nymphalidae. It is found in the Democratic Republic of the Congo (Haut-Lomani), western Tanzania and western Zambia. The habitat consists of Brachystegia woodland, savanna and open areas.

== Taxonomy ==
It is a member of the Acraea rahira species group- but see also Pierre & Bernaud, 2014
