= Acraea loranae =

Scientific classification
- Kingdom: Animalia
- Phylum: Arthropoda
- Class: Insecta
- Order: Lepidoptera
- Family: Nymphalidae
- Genus: Acraea
- Species: A. loranae

Binomial name
- Acraea loranae Pierre, 1987

Synonyms
- Acraea (Acraea) loranae

Species of butterfly

Acraea loranae is a butterfly in the family Nymphalidae. It is found in the Democratic Republic of the Congo (Shaba).

== Taxonomy ==
It is a member of the Acraea acrita species group.
