= Acraea magnifica =

Scientific classification
- Kingdom: Animalia
- Phylum: Arthropoda
- Class: Insecta
- Order: Lepidoptera
- Family: Nymphalidae
- Genus: Acraea
- Species: A. magnifica

Binomial name
- Acraea magnifica Carpenter & Jackson, 1950

Synonyms
- Acraea (Acraea) magnifica; Acraea chilo magnifica Carpenter & Jackson, 1950

Species of butterfly

Acraea magnifica is a butterfly in the family Nymphalidae. It is found in Kenya, from the northern part of the country to Mount Marsabit and Mount Kulal.

Acraea magnifica is a member of the Acraea zetes species group - but see also Pierre & Bernaud, 2014
