= Acraea pierrei =

Scientific classification
- Kingdom: Animalia
- Phylum: Arthropoda
- Class: Insecta
- Order: Lepidoptera
- Family: Nymphalidae
- Genus: Acraea
- Species: A. pierrei

Binomial name
- Acraea pierrei Berger, 1981

Synonyms
- Acraea (Actinote) pierrei

Species of butterfly

Acraea pierrei is a butterfly in the family Nymphalidae. It is found in the Democratic Republic of the Congo (northern Kivu).

== Taxonomy ==
Acraea cabira is a member of the Acraea bonasia species group; see Acraea. See also Pierre & Bernaud, 2014
