= Acraea simulator =

Scientific classification
- Kingdom: Animalia
- Phylum: Arthropoda
- Class: Insecta
- Order: Lepidoptera
- Family: Nymphalidae
- Genus: Acraea
- Species: A. simulator

Binomial name
- Acraea simulator Ackery, 1995

Synonyms
- Acraea (Actinote) simulator; Planema simulata Le Doux, 1932

Species of butterfly

Acraea simulator is a butterfly in the family Nymphalidae. It is found in Cameroon. For taxonomy see Pierre & Bernaud, 2014
