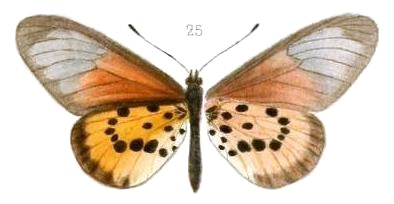
- Female from Lake Alaotra in Antsianaka district of Madagascar

Scientific classification
- Kingdom: Animalia
- Phylum: Arthropoda
- Class: Insecta
- Order: Lepidoptera
- Family: Nymphalidae
- Genus: Acraea
- Species: A. strattipocles

Binomial name
- Acraea strattipocles Oberthür, 1893

Synonyms
- Acraea (Actinote) strattipocles; Acraea strattipocles var. albescens Oberthür, 1916; Acraea strattipocles var. cervina Oberthür, 1916

= Acraea strattipocles =

Species of butterfly

Acraea strattipocles is a butterfly in the family Nymphalidae. It is found on Madagascar.

== Description ==
A. strattipocles Oberth. (56 f) is very similar to Acraea igola, but has the discal dots of the hindwing much larger and completely developed and its inner margin whitish. Madagascar.

== Biology ==
The habitat consists of forests.

== Taxonomy ==
It is a member of the Acraea masamba species group - but see also Pierre & Bernaud, 2014
