= Acraea kuekenthali =

Scientific classification
- Kingdom: Animalia
- Phylum: Arthropoda
- Class: Insecta
- Order: Lepidoptera
- Family: Nymphalidae
- Genus: Acraea
- Species: A. kuekenthali

Binomial name
- Acraea kuekenthali Le Doux, 1922

Synonyms
- Acraea (Actinote) kuekenthali; Acraea salmonea Le Doux, 1922 (Preocc.)

Species of butterfly

Acraea kuekenthali is a butterfly in the family Nymphalidae. It is found in southern Tanzania and the Democratic Republic of the Congo (Shaba).

== Taxonomy ==
It is a member of the Acraea circeis species group - but see also Pierre & Bernaud, 2014 where it is treated as a subspecies of Acraea conradti.
