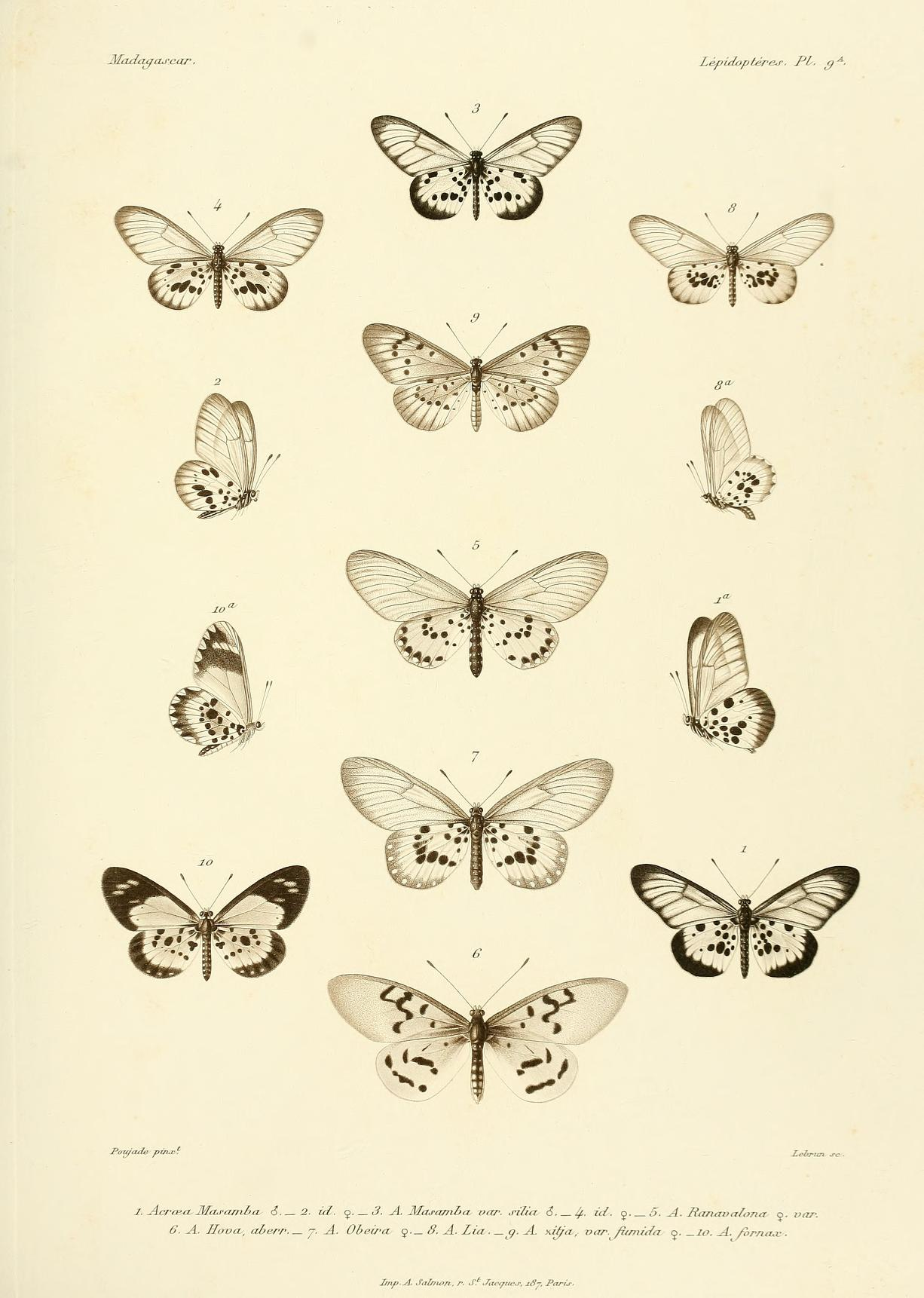

Scientific classification
- Kingdom: Animalia
- Phylum: Arthropoda
- Class: Insecta
- Order: Lepidoptera
- Family: Nymphalidae
- Genus: Acraea
- Species: A. silia

Binomial name
- Acraea silia Mabille, [1885]

Synonyms
- Acraea masamba var. silia Mabille, [1885]; Acraea (Actinote) silia; Acraea masamba r. debilis Oberthür, 1916

= Acraea silia =

Species of butterfly

Acraea silia is a butterfly in the family Nymphalidae. It is found on Madagascar.

== Description ==
Very close to Acraea masamba q.v. for differences

== Biology ==
The habitat consists of forests.

== Taxonomy ==
Uncertain species group but see also Pierre & Bernaud, 2014
