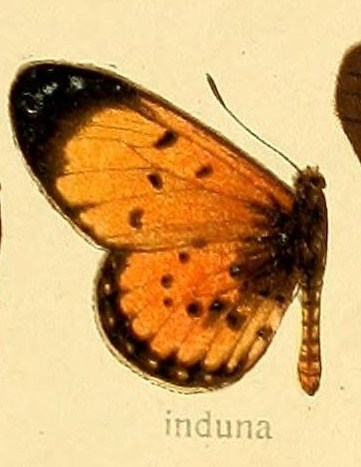

Scientific classification
- Kingdom: Animalia
- Phylum: Arthropoda
- Class: Insecta
- Order: Lepidoptera
- Family: Nymphalidae
- Genus: Acraea
- Species: A. induna

Binomial name
- Acraea induna Trimen, 1895

Synonyms
- Hyalites induna (Trimen, 1895); Actinote induna (Trimen, 1895); Telchinia induna (Trimen, 1895); Hyalites induna salmontana Henning & Henning, 1996

= Acraea induna =

Species of butterfly

Acraea induna, the induna acraea, is a butterfly of the family Nymphalidae. It is found in Malawi, Zambia, Zimbabwe and South Africa. The habitat consists of woodland and montane grassland.

== Description ==
Very similar to Acraea anacreon qv. The wingspan is 29–54 mm for males and 54–62 mm for females.

== Subspecies ==
- Acraea induna induna (Malawi, Zambia, Zimbabwe: eastern highlands)
- Acraea induna salmontana (Henning & Henning, 1996) (only found in montane sourveld on the ridges of the Soutpansberg in the Limpopo Province)

== Taxonomy ==
It is a member of the Acraea rahira species group.

== Biology ==
Adults are on wing from March to May. There is one generation per year.

The larvae feed on Aeschynomene nodulosa.

== Taxonomy ==
It is a member of the Acraea rahira species group. But see also Pierre & Bernaud, 2014.
