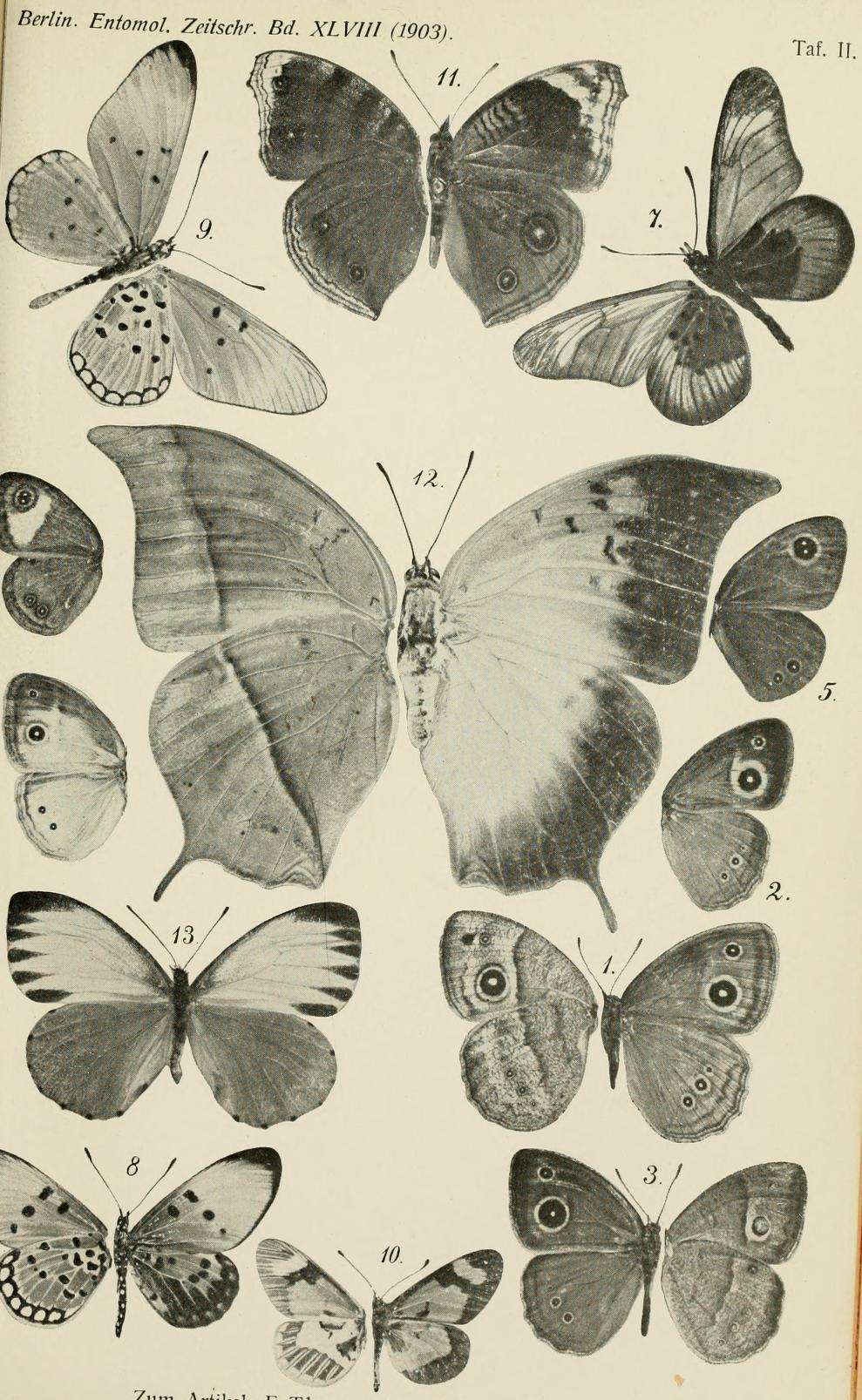
- Figure 10

Scientific classification
- Kingdom: Animalia
- Phylum: Arthropoda
- Class: Insecta
- Order: Lepidoptera
- Family: Nymphalidae
- Genus: Acraea
- Species: A. goetzei

Binomial name
- Acraea goetzei Thurau, 1903

Synonyms
- Acraea (Actinote) goetzei; Acraea byatti Neave, 1904

= Acraea goetzei =

Species of butterfly

Acraea goetzei is a butterfly in the family Nymphalidae. It is found in southern Malawi, eastern Zambia, southern and western Tanzania, south-western Uganda, Rwanda, Burundi, the Democratic Republic of the Congo (southern Kivu) and Zimbabwe.

== Description ==
A. goetzei is similar above to an Acraea serena without spots at the distal margin, but differs in having the hindwing black at the base as far as vein 2; the forewing is also narrowly black at the base; the large hindmarginal spot of the fore wing covers cellules 1 a to 3 to beyond the middle and almost the whole of the cell and is orange-red, like the entirely free subapical band; the median band of the hindwing has the same colour or is somewhat tinged with yellowish at the inner margin; it is only 3 mm. in breadth at the inner margin, but widens anteriorly and in cellules 4 and 5 has a breadth of about 9 mm. The ground of the hindwing is light yellow and the basal half is almost without markings in the middle, the cell having only a black dot near the base and 1 or 2 small dots at the apex; the discal dots in 3 to 5 entirely absent; cellule 1 c, on the other hand, has a broad red stripe from the base to the discal dot and there is another similar streak in cellule 7, bounded at each side by a black transverse streak. The gaily coloured marginal band, as in ventura, is much narrower in cellules 4 to 7 than in 1 b to 3 and basally bordered by a fine dark line; the veins are black and bordered at each side by a whitish line; the marginal spots are broad and short, proximally rounded and continued by broad red, black-edged stripes which reach the proximal boundary-line. Nyassaland and German East Africa (in the interior).

== Biology ==
The habitat consists of montane forests.

Adults are on wing year round, with a peak from March to June.

The larvae feed on Triumfetta rhomboidea.

== Taxonomy ==
Acraea goetzei is a member of the Acraea bonasia species group; see Acraea.

See also Pierre & Bernaud, 2014
