= Orange acraea =

Orange acraea is a name applied to three butterflies of tropical Africa and adjacent Arabia:

- Acraea alalonga (long-winged orange acraea), restricted to northeastern South Africa
- Acraea anacreon (large orange acraea), found in eastern and southern Africa
- Acraea eponina (small orange acraea), widespread in tropical Africa and adjacent areas

Despite conventionally placed in the genus Acraea, they do not seem to be particularly close relatives and eventually are likely to be assigned to at least two different genera. Some authors place A. anacreon in Telchinia, but if anything the older name Auracraea might be more correct. Whether the other two will remain in Acraea is not clear either.
