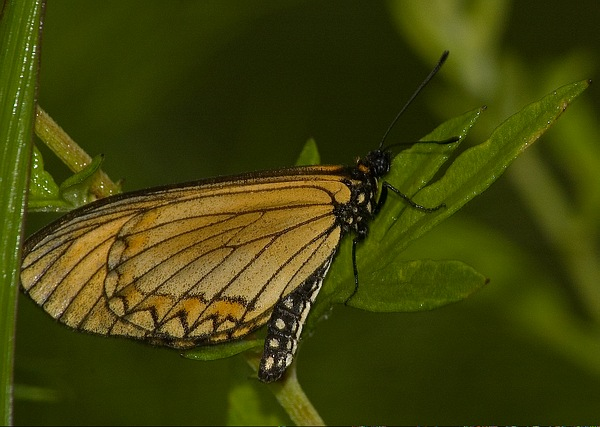
- Imago
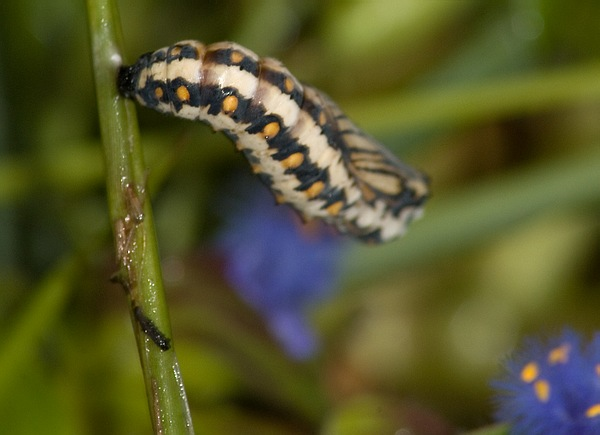
- Caterpillar

Scientific classification
- Domain: Eukaryota
- Kingdom: Animalia
- Phylum: Arthropoda
- Class: Insecta
- Order: Lepidoptera
- Family: Nymphalidae
- Genus: Acraea
- Species: A. issoria

Binomial name
- Acraea issoria (Hübner, 1819)

Synonyms
- Pareba vesta

= Acraea issoria =

Yellow coster

Species of butterfly

Acraea issoria, the yellow coster, is a small, leathery-winged butterfly. This species of the subgenus (Actinote) and the tawny coster (Acraea (acraea) terpsicore) with its sister species (A. (a.) moluccana) and (A. (a.) meyeri) of the nominotypical subgenus, are the only Asiatic representatives of the predominantly African subfamily Acraeinae.

According to George Talbot (Fauna of British India) the race anomala is found in the western Himalayas while the nominate form is from the eastern Himalayas.

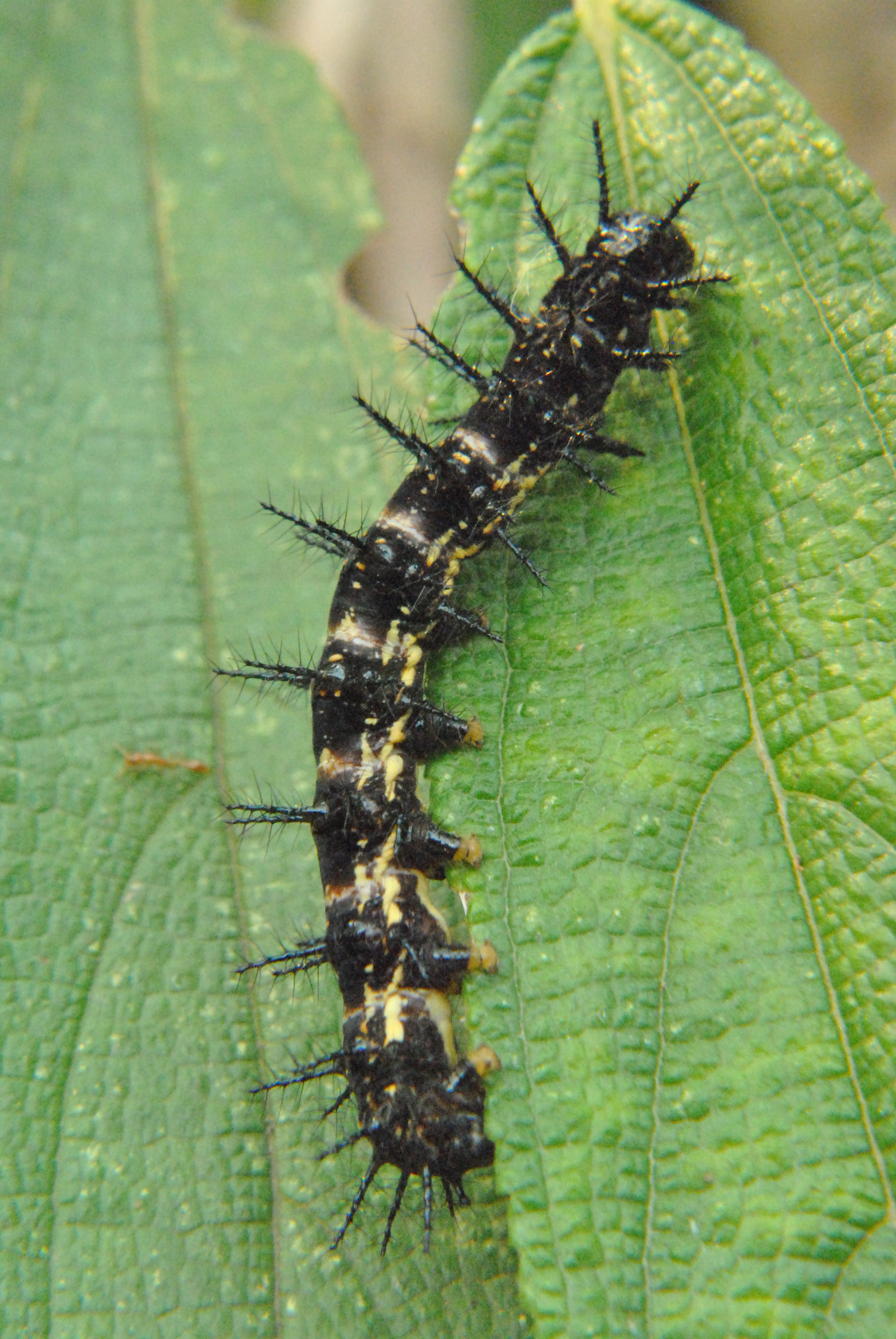
Larva in Jayanti, Buxa Tiger Reserve, West Bengal, India

== Description ==
Male. Upperside yellow. Fore wing: veins along the costal margin broadly and apical half of those along the terminal margin narrowly black; a broad curved mark along the discocellulars, the apex and terminal margin more or less broadly also black, the last traversed by a series of spots of the ground-colour. Hind wing: apical half of the veins from 1 a to 8, subterminal zigzag and terminal slender lines, black, the subterminal line coalescing with the terminal along the veins. Underside: fore wing ground-colour yellow, getting paler towards apex, the veins conspicuously darker, the black discocellular mark showing through by transparency. Hind wing: ground-colour a delicate pinkish white, the veins conspicuously black; a broad subterminal ochraceous lunular band margined on both inner and outer sides by black lines, and a terminal, slender black line continued along the dorsum. Antennae, head, thorax and abdomen black, the thorax with a little ochraceous yellow pubescence anteriorly; thorax and abdomen beneath black sparingly marked and spotted with very pale ochraceous.

Female. Upperside: ground-colour a paler duller ochraceous yellow than in the male, with similar but broader black markings. Underside: ground-colour duller than in the male, the black markings showing through by transparency.

== See also ==
- List of butterflies of India (Nymphalidae)
