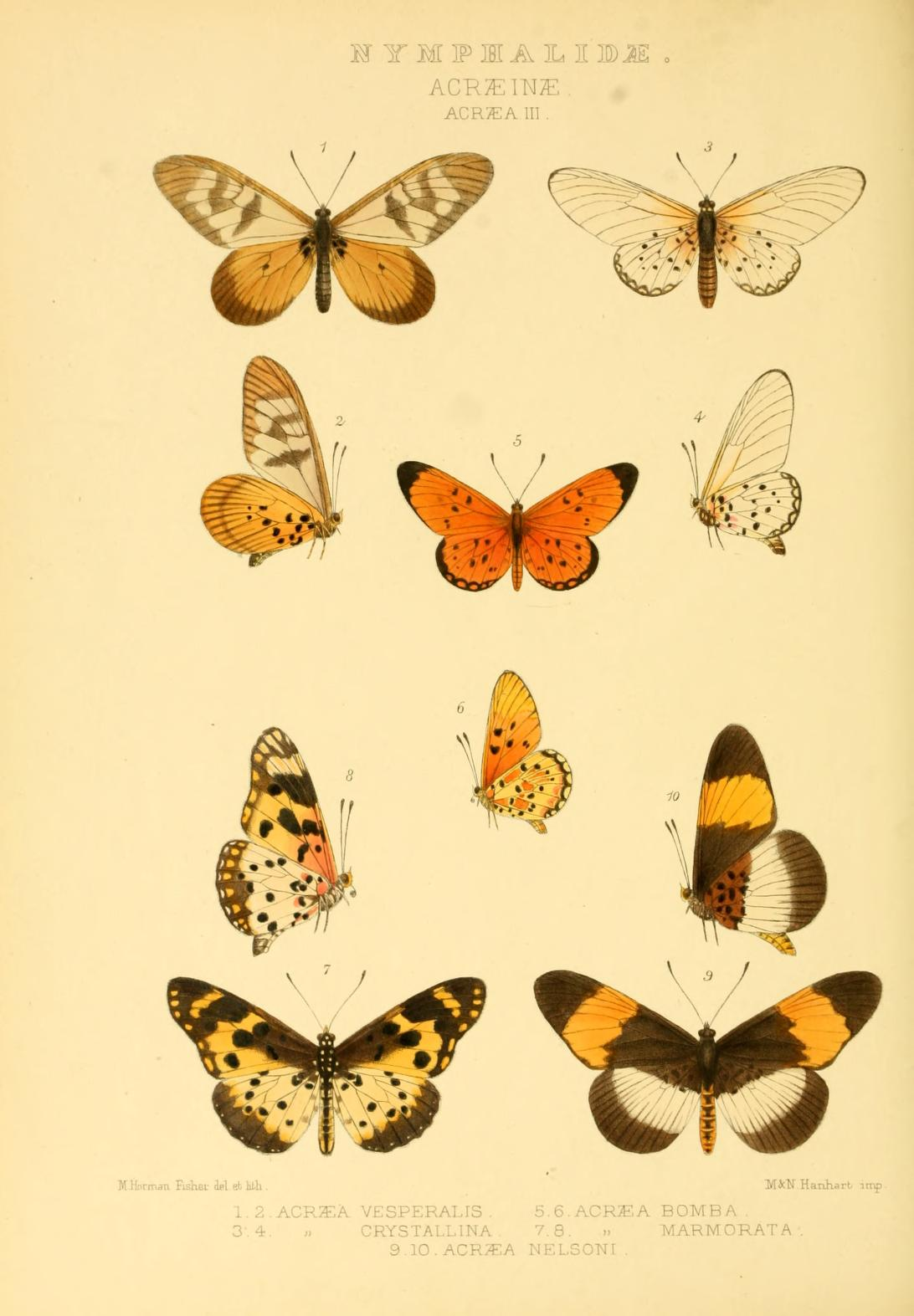
- Figures 5 and 6

Scientific classification
- Kingdom: Animalia
- Phylum: Arthropoda
- Class: Insecta
- Order: Lepidoptera
- Family: Nymphalidae
- Genus: Acraea
- Species: A. bomba

Binomial name
- Acraea bomba Grose-Smith, 1889

Synonyms
- Acraea (Actinote) bomba; Acraea anacreon bomba

= Acraea bomba =

Species of butterfly

Acraea bomba, the Bomba acraea, is a butterfly in the family Nymphalidae. It is found in Kenya, Tanzania, Malawi, Zambia and on the eastern highlands of Zimbabwe.

== Description ==
Very similar to Acraea anacreon qv. for diagnosis

== Biology ==
The habitat consists of grassland and open woodland.

Adults are on wing year round.

The larvae feed on Alchemilla gracilipes, Aeschynomene, Adenia and Wormskioldia species.

== Taxonomy ==
It is a member of the Acraea rahira species group - but see also Pierre & Bernaud, 2014
