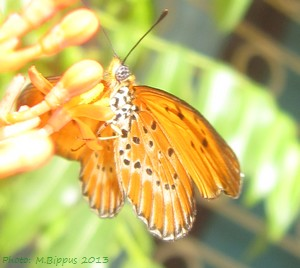

Scientific classification
- Kingdom: Animalia
- Phylum: Arthropoda
- Class: Insecta
- Order: Lepidoptera
- Family: Nymphalidae
- Genus: Acraea
- Species: A. calida

Binomial name
- Acraea calida Butler, 1878

Synonyms
- Acraea (Actinote) calida

= Acraea calida =

Species of butterfly

Acraea calida is a butterfly in the family Nymphalidae. It is found on Madagascar. The habitat consists of forest margins, grassland and anthropogenic environments.

== Description ==
Very similar to Acraea zitja qv. for diagnosis

== Taxonomy ==
It is a member of the Acraea rahira species group- but see also Pierre & Bernaud, 2014
