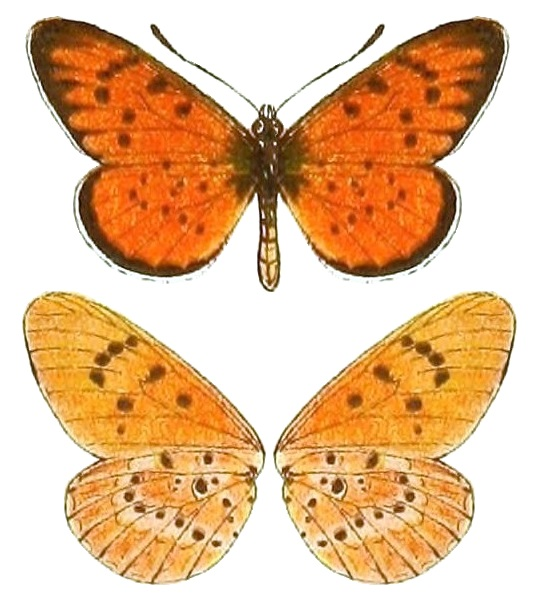
- upper and underside of imago

Scientific classification
- Kingdom: Animalia
- Phylum: Arthropoda
- Class: Insecta
- Order: Lepidoptera
- Family: Nymphalidae
- Genus: Acraea
- Species: A. zitja

Binomial name
- Acraea zitja Boisduval, 1833

Synonyms
- Acraea (Actinote) zitja; Acraea rakeli Boisduval, 1833; Acraea zitja var. radiata Guénée, 1865; Acroeea zitja var. fumida Mabille, 1880

= Acraea zitja =

Species of butterfly

Acraea zitja is a butterfly in the family Nymphalidae. It is found on Madagascar.

== Description ==
A. zitja Bdv. (55 g). Both wings above brick-red with narrow black marginal band, which is more or less proximally prolonged at the veins; the forewing in addition with black costal margin, with a black dot in the cell, a larger one at the end of the cell and free black discal dots in 1 b to 6; hindwing above with some basal dots and with discal dots in 1 c to 7; forewing beneath without dark marginal band but with the extremities of the veins black, otherwise marked as above. The hindwing beneath with reddish ground-colour and with a narrow whitish median band, at the proximal side of which the discal dots are placed; the whitish colour of this band is continued to the distal margin as light lines at each side of the veins; the small transverse light marginal spots are proximally bordered by black streaks, which, however, do not touch in the middle. Madagascar. - ab. radiata Guen. differs in having the light bordering of the veins in the marginal band of the hindwing beneath much broader than in the type-form; the females have a yellow-brown ground-colour. Madagascar. - female ab. calida Btlr. [ now species Acraea calida resembles radiata but has, instead of the marginal band of the upper surface, triangular black spots at the extremities of the veins. Madagascar. In ab. rakeli Bdv. the light bordering of the veins is entirely absent in the distal part of the hindwing beneath and also the proximal bordering of the marginal spots is often indistinct; hence the marginal band becomes almost unicolorous. - female ab. fumida Mab. has a grey ground-colour, on both wings relieved with whitish at the discal dots; the marginal band on the underside of the hindwing apparently always agrees with that of rakeli. Madagascar.

== Biology ==
The habitat consists of forest margins, grassland and anthropogenic environments.

== Taxonomy ==
It is a member of the Acraea rahira species group- but see also Pierre & Bernaud, 2014
