= Acraea anacreontica =

Scientific classification
- Kingdom: Animalia
- Phylum: Arthropoda
- Class: Insecta
- Order: Lepidoptera
- Family: Nymphalidae
- Genus: Acraea
- Species: A. anacreontica

Binomial name
- Acraea anacreontica Grose-Smith, 1898

Synonyms
- Acraea (Actinote) anacreontica; Acraea anacreon anacreonita

Species of butterfly

Acraea anacreontica is a butterfly in the family Nymphalidae. It is found in Kenya, Uganda and the Democratic Republic of the Congo.

== Description ==
Very similar to Acraea anacreon qv.

== Subspecies ==
- Acraea anacreontica anacreontica (western Kenya, Uganda, Democratic Republic of the Congo)
- Acraea anacreontica chyulu van Someren, 1939 (Kenya: south-east to the Chyulu Hills)

== Taxonomy ==
It is a member of the Acraea rahira species group - but see also Pierre & Bernaud, 2014
