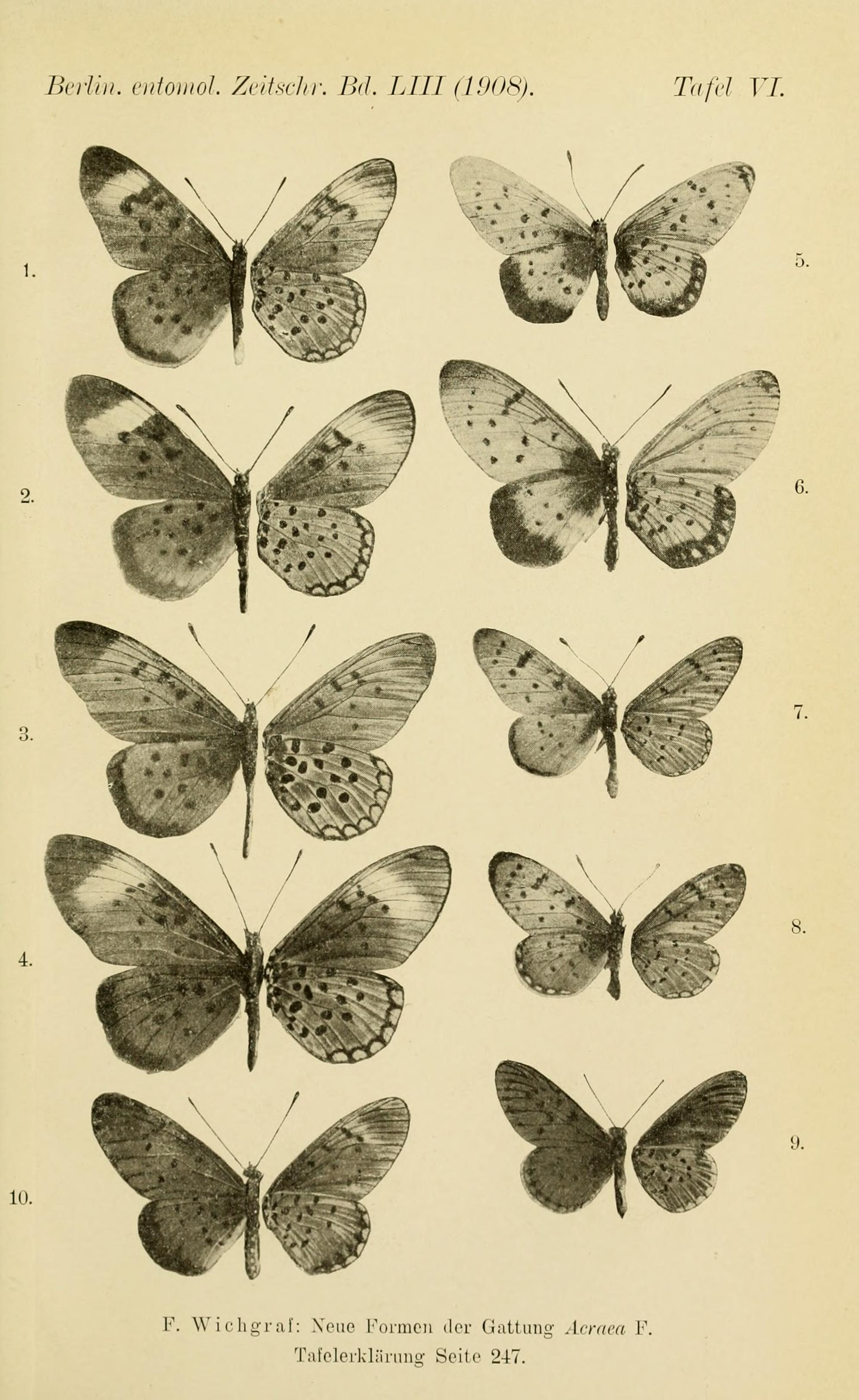
- Figure 9

Scientific classification
- Kingdom: Animalia
- Phylum: Arthropoda
- Class: Insecta
- Order: Lepidoptera
- Family: Nymphalidae
- Genus: Acraea
- Species: A. speciosa

Binomial name
- Acraea speciosa Wichgraf, 1909

Synonyms
- Acraea anacreon speciosa Wichgraf, 1909; Acraea (Actinote) speciosa

= Acraea speciosa =

Species of butterfly

Acraea speciosa is a butterfly in the family Nymphalidae. It is found in Angola and Zambia.

== Description ==
Very close to Acraea anacreon q.v for diagnosis

== Taxonomy ==
It is a member of the Acraea rahira species group.- but see also Pierre & Bernaud, 2014
