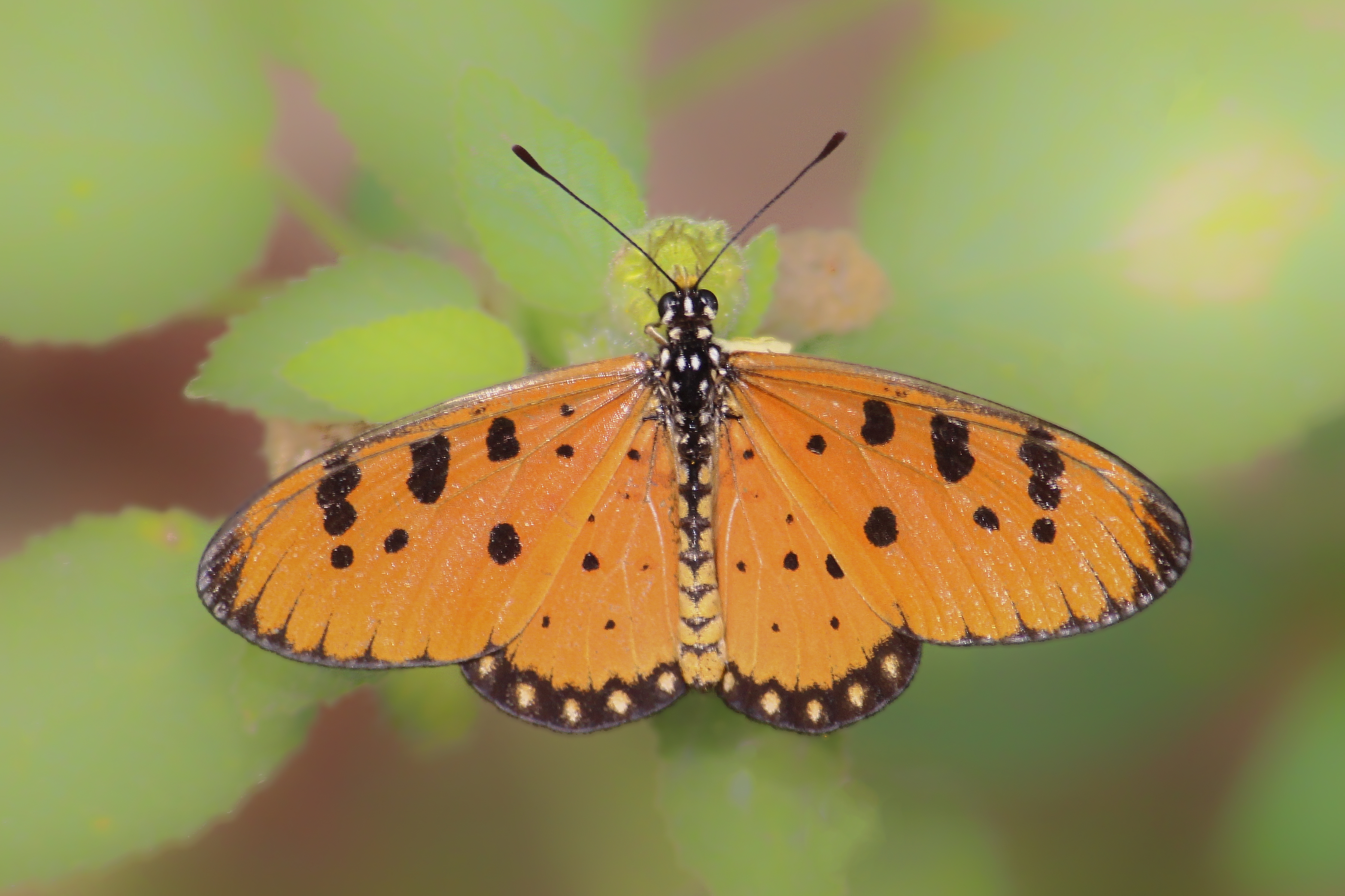
- Upperside, West Bengal, India
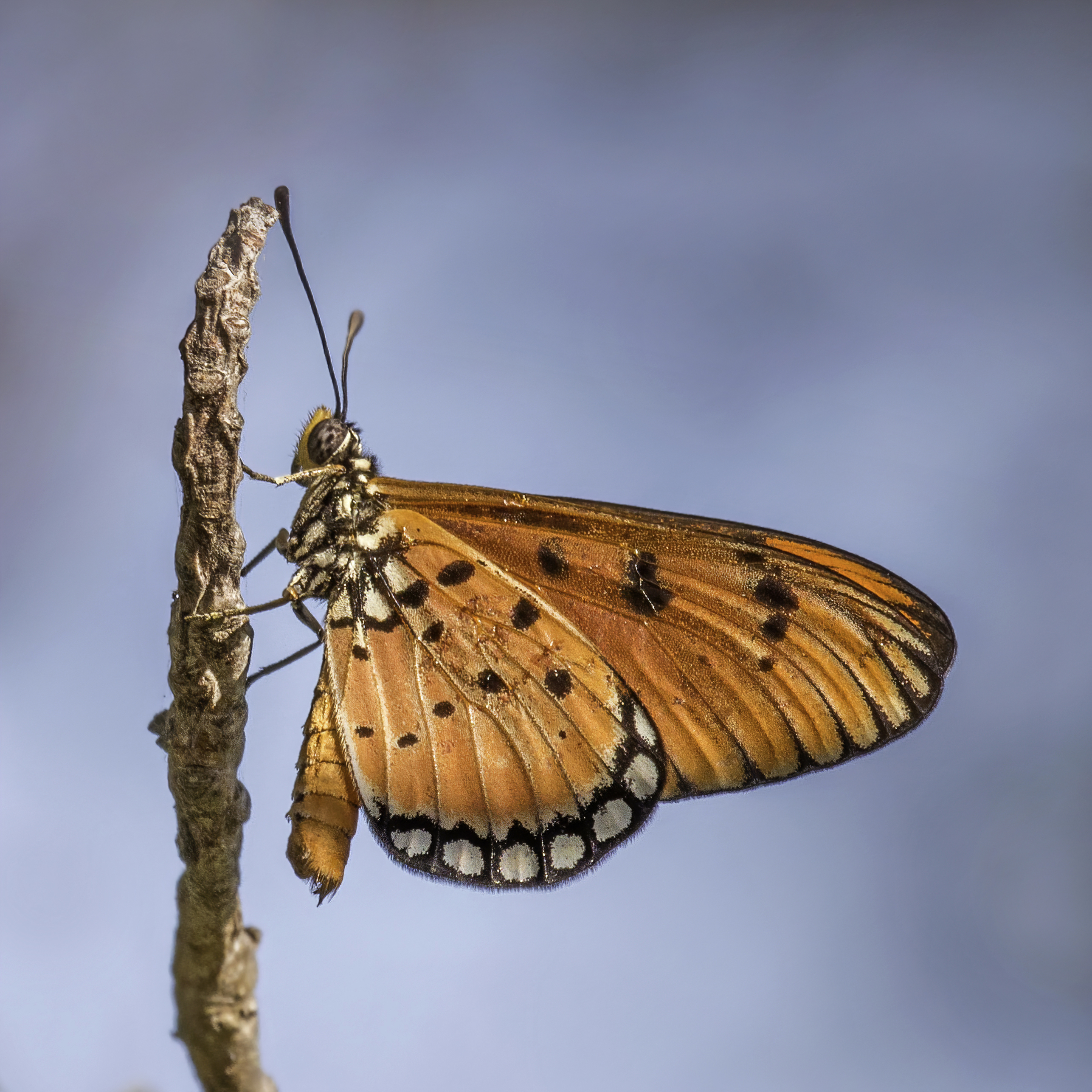
- Underside, Komodo, Indonesia

Scientific classification
- Kingdom: Animalia
- Phylum: Arthropoda
- Clade: Pancrustacea
- Class: Insecta
- Order: Lepidoptera
- Family: Nymphalidae
- Genus: Acraea
- Species: A. terpsicore

Binomial name
- Acraea terpsicore (Linnaeus, 1758)

Synonyms
- Acraea violae (Fabricius, 1775)

= Acraea terpsicore =

Tawny coster

Species of butterfly

Acraea terpsicore, the tawny coster, is a small, 53–64 millimetres (2.1–2.5 in), leathery-winged butterfly common in grassland and scrub habitats. It belongs to the Nymphalidae or brush-footed butterfly family. It has a weak fluttery flight. It is avoided by most insect predators. This species and the yellow coster (Acraea issoria) are the only two Indian representatives of the predominantly African tribe Acraeini. It is found in India, Sri Lanka, Indonesia, Maldives to Myanmar, Thailand, Laos, Cambodia, Vietnam, Bangladesh, Malaysia, Singapore, and recently Australia.

== Taxonomy ==
=== Controversies ===
There has been long standing debate among taxonomists on whether the correct name for this species is Acraea terpsicore Linnaeus, 1758 or Acraea violae Fabricius, 1775. Pierre and Bernaud, in 1997, stated that they verified the type in the Linnean Society of London and considered A. violae the same species as A. terpsicore. Honey and Scoble, in 2001, argued that both specimens in the Linnean Society are later additions by James Edward Smith (botanist) who, in 1784, purchased Linnaeus specimens, bringing them to London. In the absence of authentic syntypes, the identity of terpsicore remains uncertain although there are chances that they may be synonyms.

=== Confusion ===
A. terpsicore was confused with the African species A. eponina Cramer, 1780. Pierre and Bernaud studied this nomenclatural problem and rehabilitate the original name Acraea serena for that species.

== Description ==
=== Male ===
Upperside tawny.

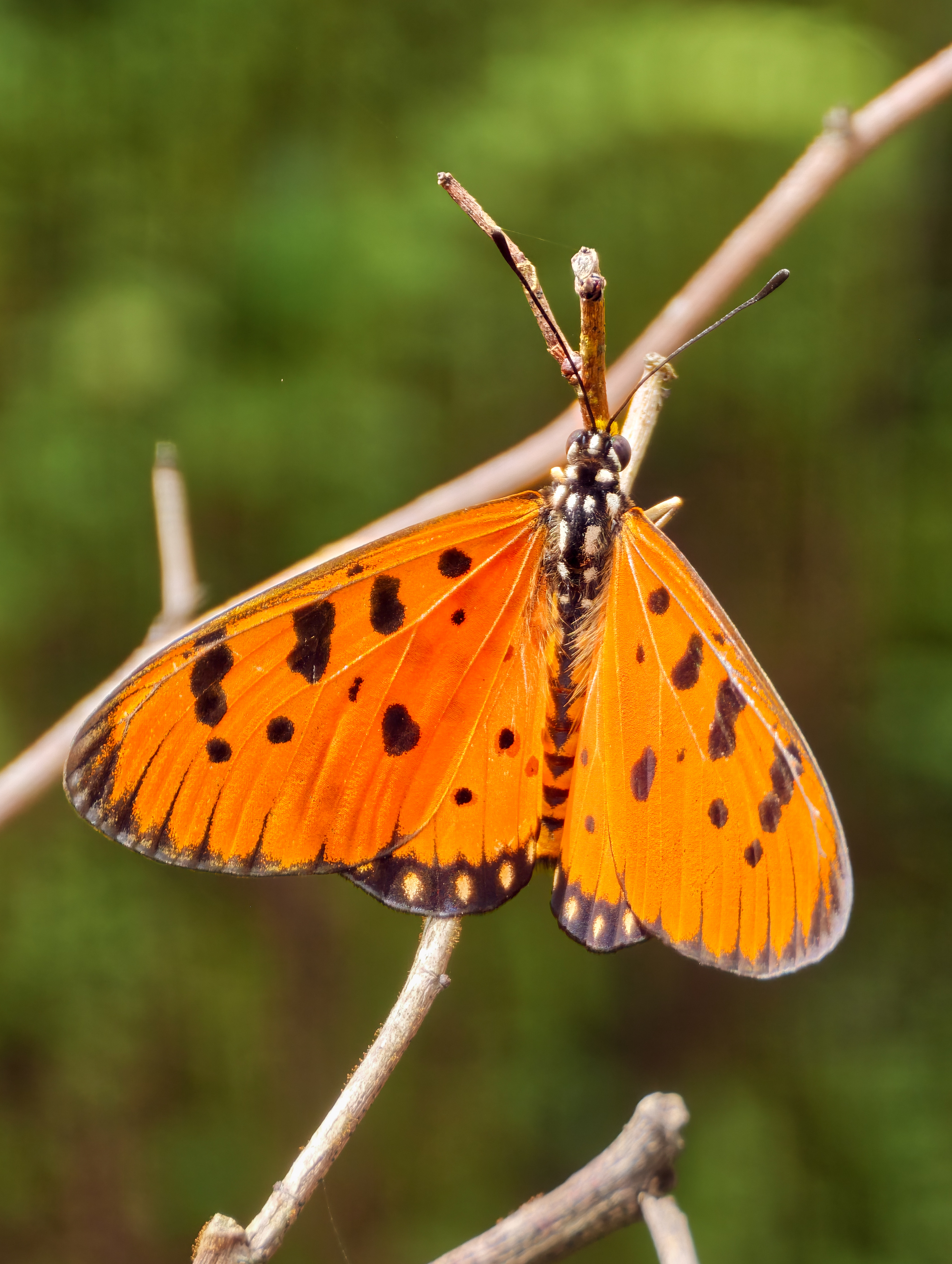
Tawny Coster butterfly moments after emerging from pupa

Forewing: a transverse black spot in cell, and another irregular, oblique and broader at the discocellulars; a discal series of spots in interspaces 1, 3, 4, 5, 6 and 10, and the apex and termen black. The upper four spots of the discal series inclined obliquely outwards, the lower two obliquely inwards; the black edging to apex and termen narrowing posteriorly, but with slender linear projections inwards in the interspaces.

Hindwing: a basal series of four or five black spots with a similar spot beyond in middle of cell and a subcostal black spot above it, followed by a discal series of obscure blackish spots and a minute postdiscal black dot in interspaces 4 and 6 respectively; finally, a broad black terminal band medially traversed by a series of small spots of the ground colour. Most of the macular black markings are obscure, being only the spots on the underside seen by the transparency of the wing membrane; the inner edge of the black terminal band crenulate.

Underside ground colour ochraceous yellow or a paler tawny yellow.

Forewing: paling to whitish on the apex, with the black markings as on the upperside but somewhat blurred and diffuse.

Hindwing: the black spots and black terminal band as on the upperside, but the spots more clearly defined, none obscure; the series of spots traversing the black terminal margin very much larger and white - not tawny; the base of the wing black, separated from the basal transverse series of black spots by two or three large whitish spots.

Antennae black, head and thorax black spotted with ochraceous and white; abdomen anteriorly black, posteriorly ochraceous yellow with narrow transverse black lines; beneath, the palpi, thorax and abdomen ochraceous, the thorax spotted with ochraceous, the abdomen with a longitudinal line of black at base.

=== Female ===
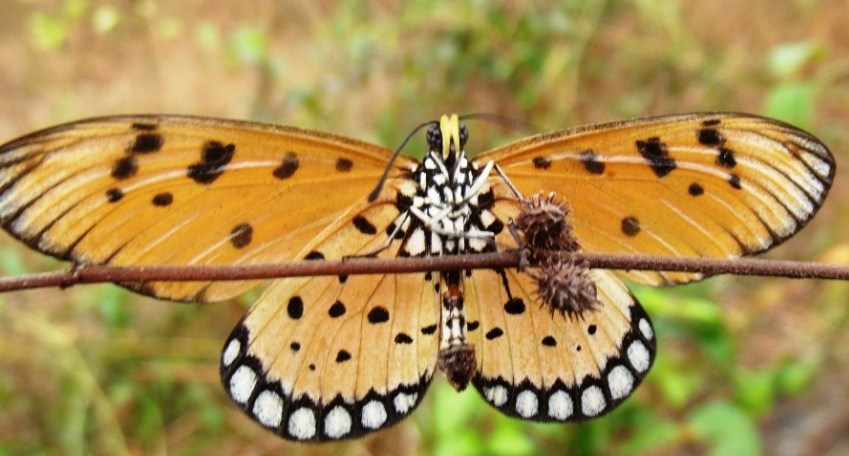
Female underside

Similar to that of the male.

Upperside ground colour duller; the black spots on forewings and hindwings larger, the upper discal spots often coalescing and forming an irregular oblique short band; the black edging to apex and termen on the forewing and the black terminal band on the hindwing proportionately broader, the spots traversing the latter larger and whitish.

Underside ground colour much paler and duller markings as on the upperside and, as in the male, the spots on the hindwing better defined than on the upperside. Antennae, bead, thorax and abdomen as in the male.

Wingspan of 53–64 mm.

== Distribution, habits and habitat ==
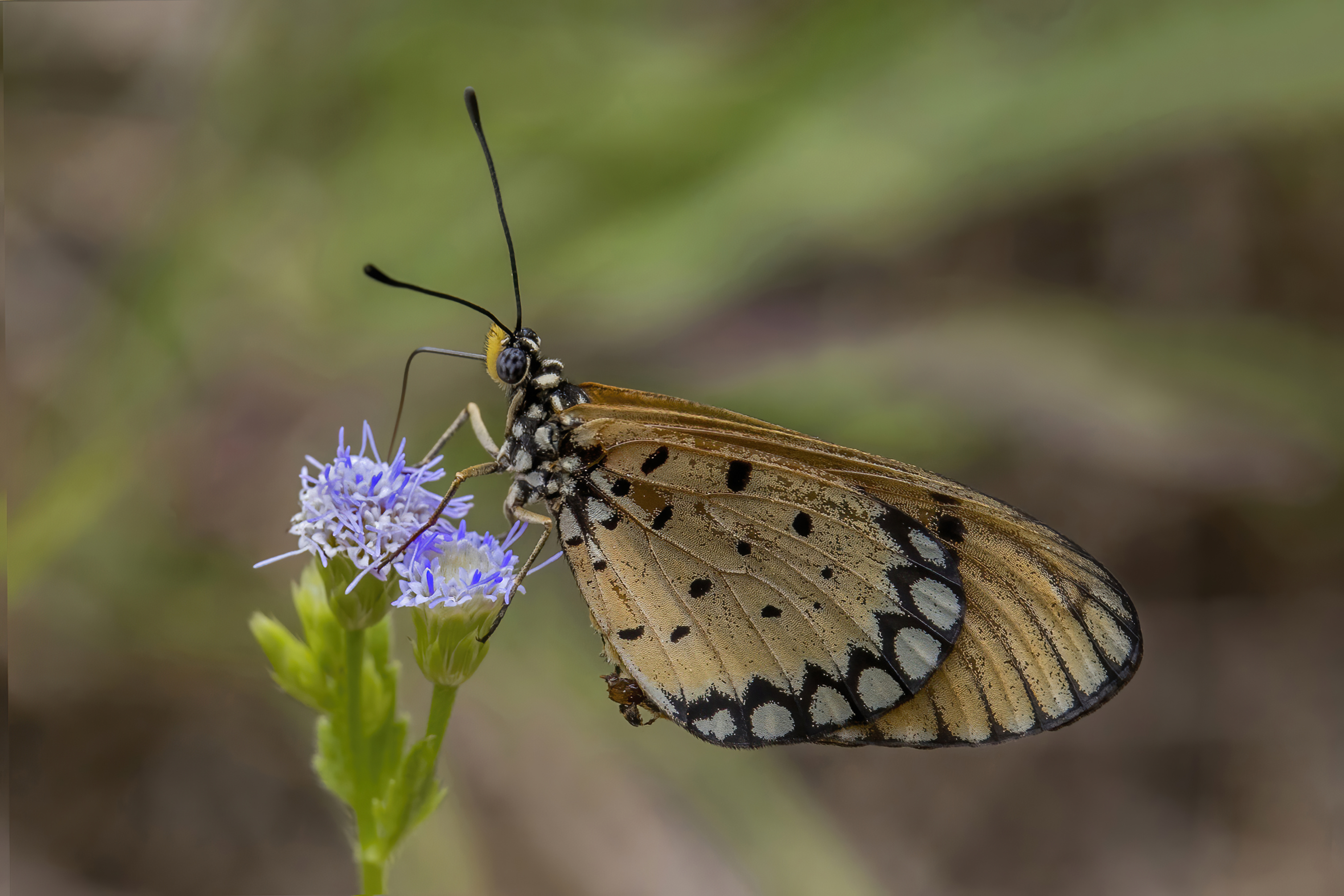
Female showing sphragis

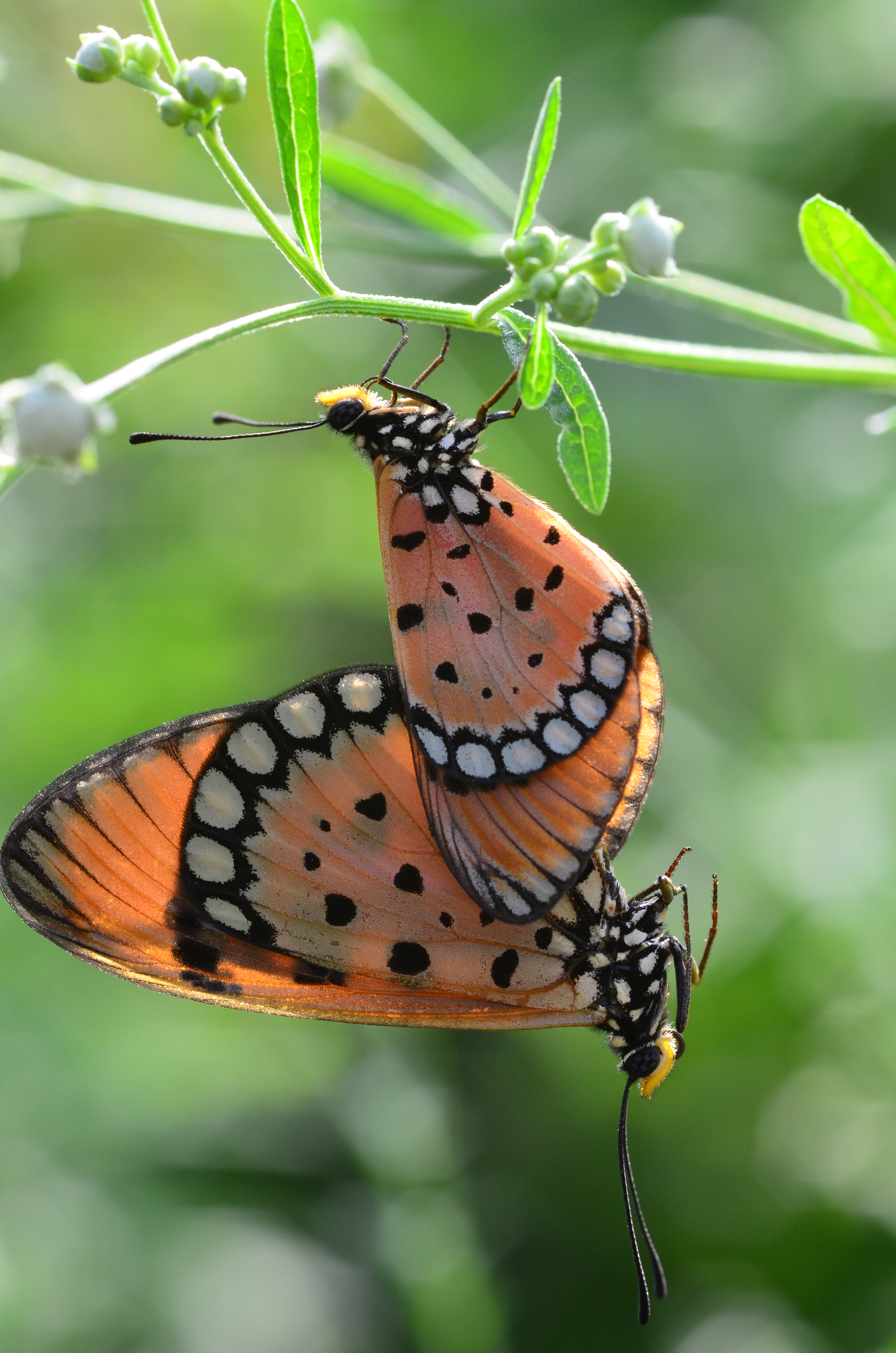
Mating

This species does not fly high, but seems to keep within 3 m of the ground and tends to rest on vegetation in the regions of a meter off the ground. Acraea terpsicore can be seen in abundance wherever its larval food plant (Passiflora species) is found. The adult tends to avoid dense undergrowth and shady areas, instead keeping to open spaces in all types of vegetation.

The adult flies slowly with weak seemingly unsteady wing beats. It is one of the boldest butterflies, protected as it is from predators by a nauseous chemical. When attacked it plays dead and exudes a noxious yellowish fluid from glands in the joints of the legs. Like all butterflies protected in this manner, Acraea terpsicore has a tough exoskeleton which enables the adult to survive a few pecks of a bird or even the bites of a lizard. Once left alone the adult immediately takes off and resumes its uncaring flight.

When feeding on flowers, this butterfly is unhurried, often spending a long time sitting on the same flower. When sitting it either spreads its wings or closes them over its back the hindwings covering the forewings to a large extent. Sometimes the butterfly will not sit, but rest gently on the flower while feeding, while doing this, to maintain balance, it beats only its forewings while keeping the hindwings completely steady.

=== Mating plugs ===
The tawny coster is one of a group of butterflies where females feature a sphragis (copulatory plug) which is formed after a mating session. After males produce the spermatophore, they pass an additional gland secretion (a waxy substance) that spills out of the female's copulatory opening, forming a mating plug that hardens within a few hours for the purpose of preventing further matings.

== Life cycle ==
The butterfly breeds on plants of the family Loganiaceae and species of Passiflora many of which contain toxins that are sequestered by the caterpillars. They have also been noted to feed on the leaves of Hybanthus enneaspermus (Violaceae) in Bengal and on Turnera ulmifolia (Passifloraceae) in Maharashtra.

=== Eggs ===
Eggs are laid in batches of anywhere between 20 and 100. Eggs are yellow and slightly elongated and tall and display shallow transverse ribbing.

=== Larva ===
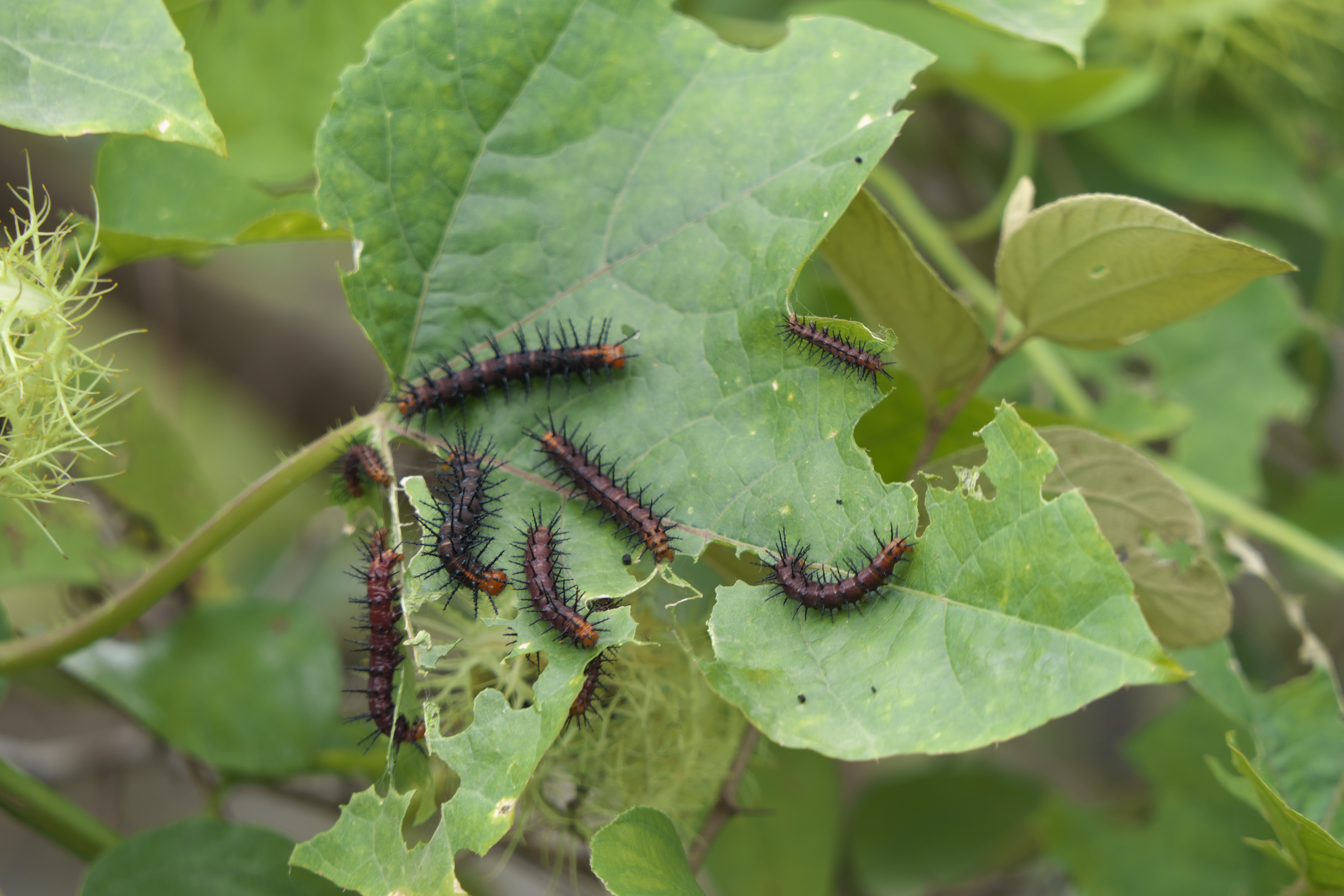
Larvae devouring passion flower leaves

The fully grown caterpillar is about 21 mm (0.83 in) in length. It is reddish brown on the upperside and a yellowish white on the underside. Each body segment bears a number of branched spines. The head is reddish. The caterpillars of a batch tend to feed gregariously and devour all soft tissue of the host plant. In this manner they can become a major menace to the passion flower plant they are feeding on. Like the adults, the caterpillar is protected by the toxins, processed from the Passiflora species.

Cylindrical, slender, with six longitudinal rows of fine branched spines; colour reddish brown with an oily gloss, much paler on the head, second and last segment; an unwholesome looking insect, doubtless protected like the butterfly. —Davidson & Aitken

=== Pupa ===
The pupa boldly marked with aposematic colours, advertising the fact that this is an unwholesome object if eaten. It is white with thick black lines, spots and markings in red and orange. The pupa hangs freely from the support without the aid of a band. The pupa is 17 mm (0.67 in) long.

Perpendicularly hung, long, slender, smooth; two lateral angles on the thorax; head quadrate; colour creamy white, with broad longitudinal bars of purplish-black spotted with orange. —Davidson & Aitken

Life cycle

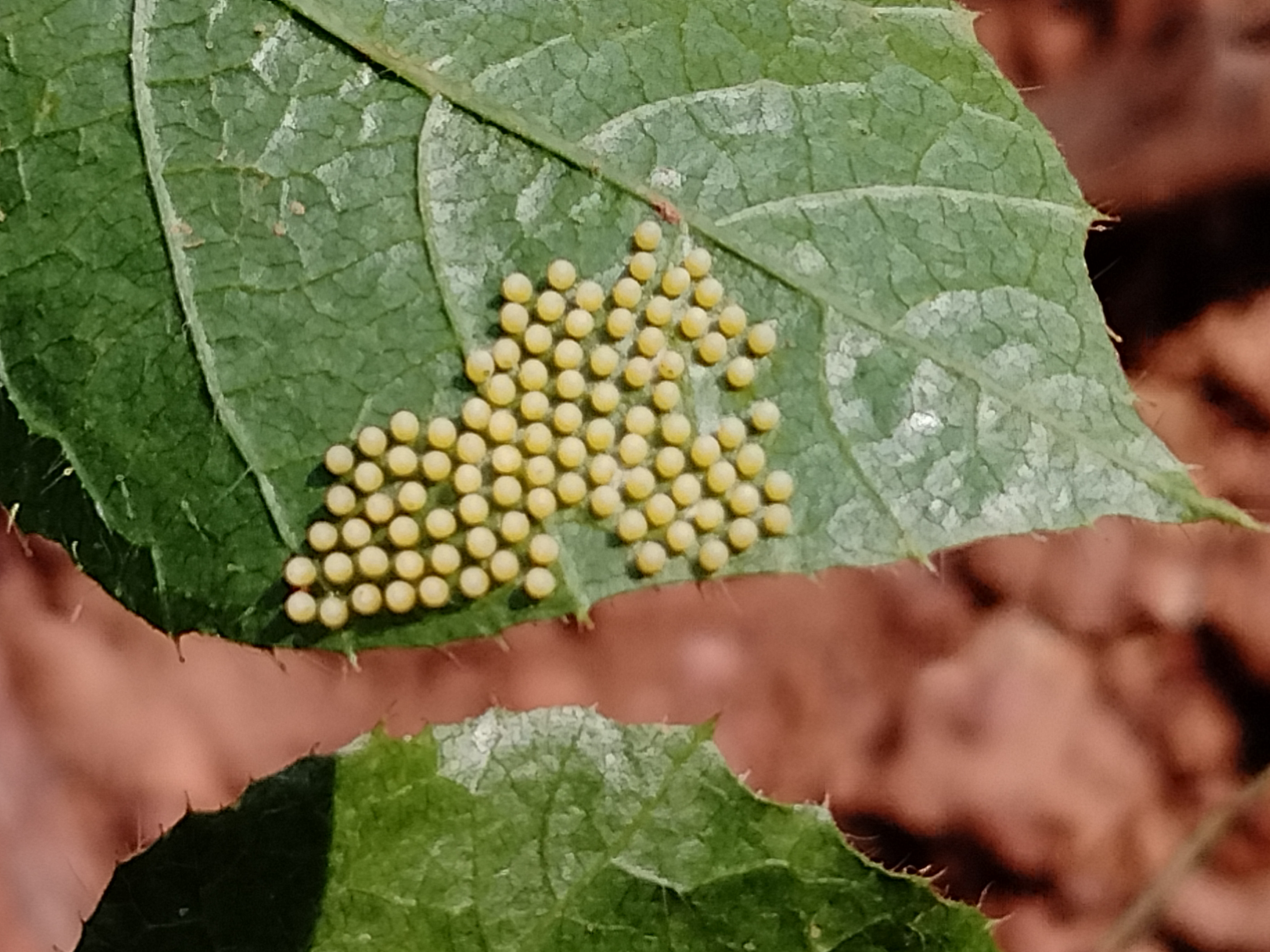
Eggs

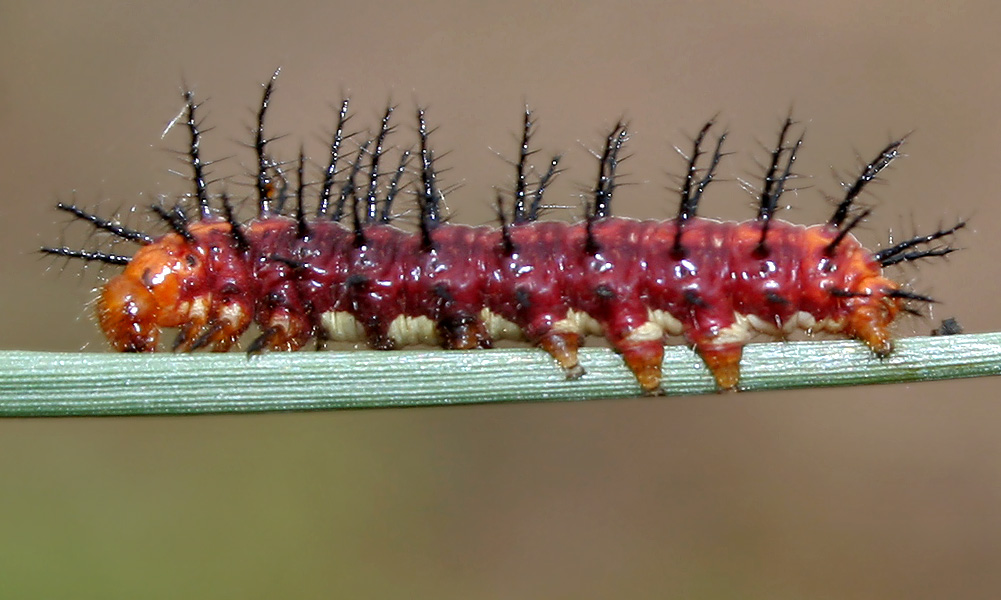
Larva

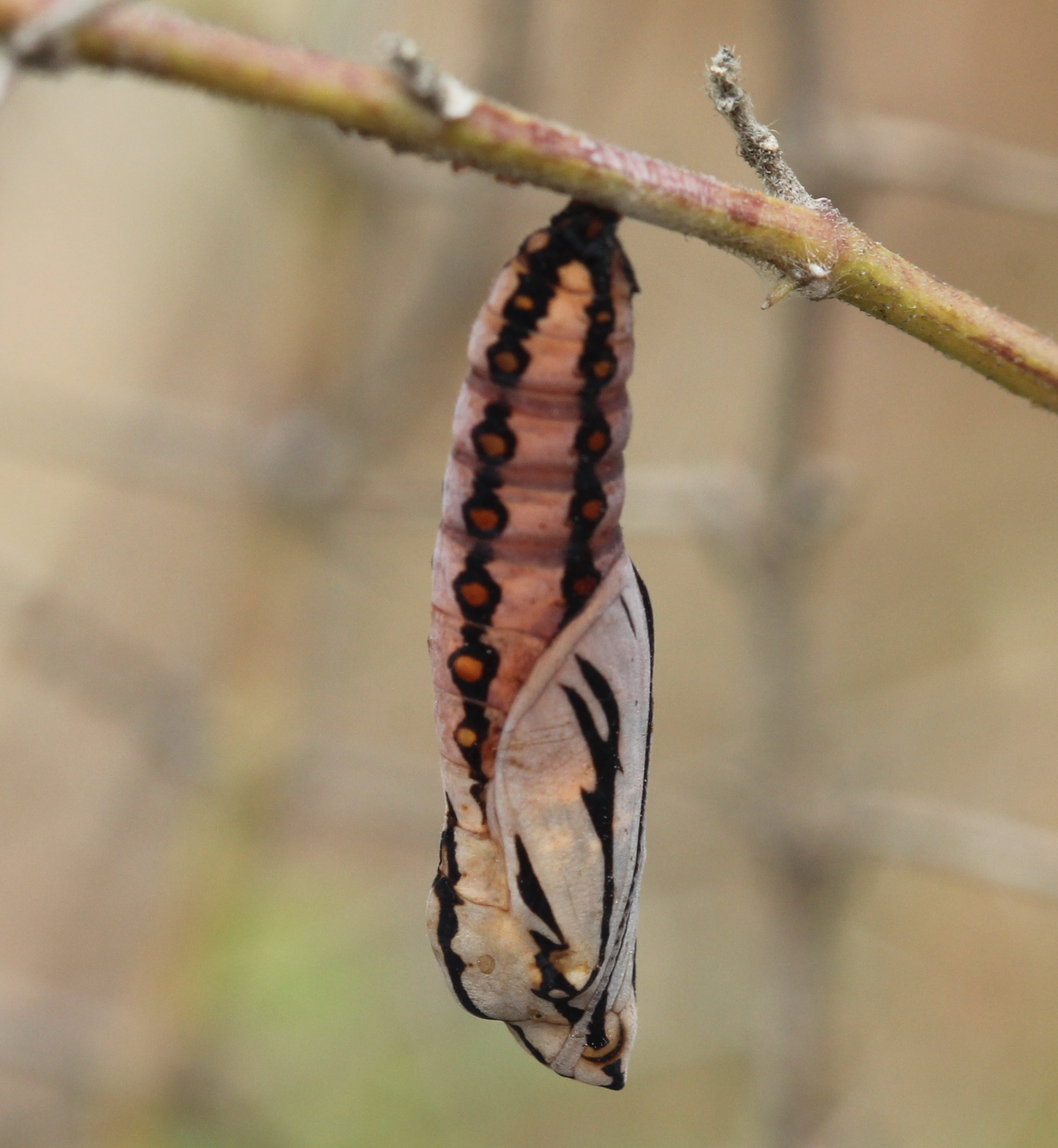
Chrysalis

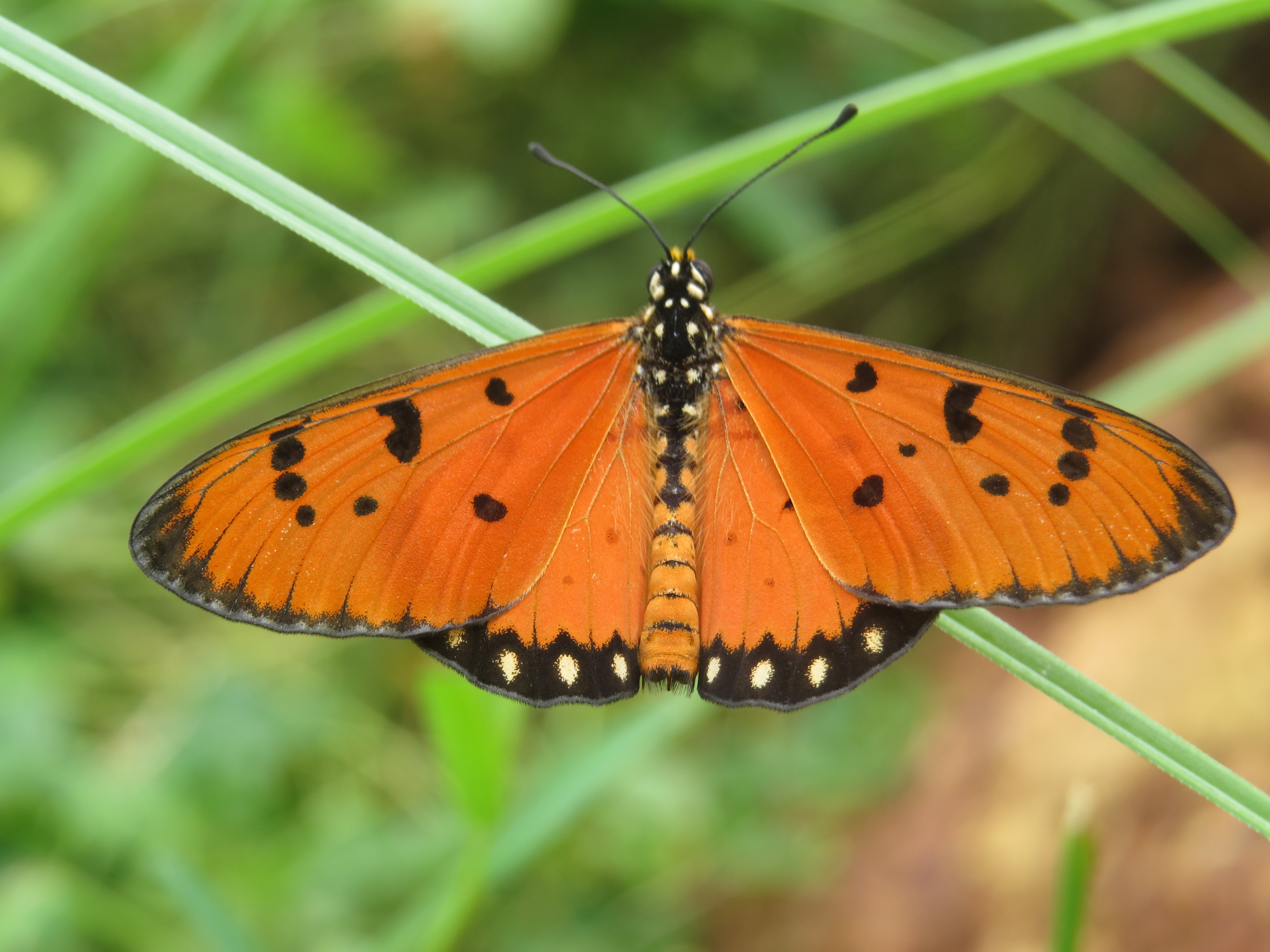
Imago (dorsal view)

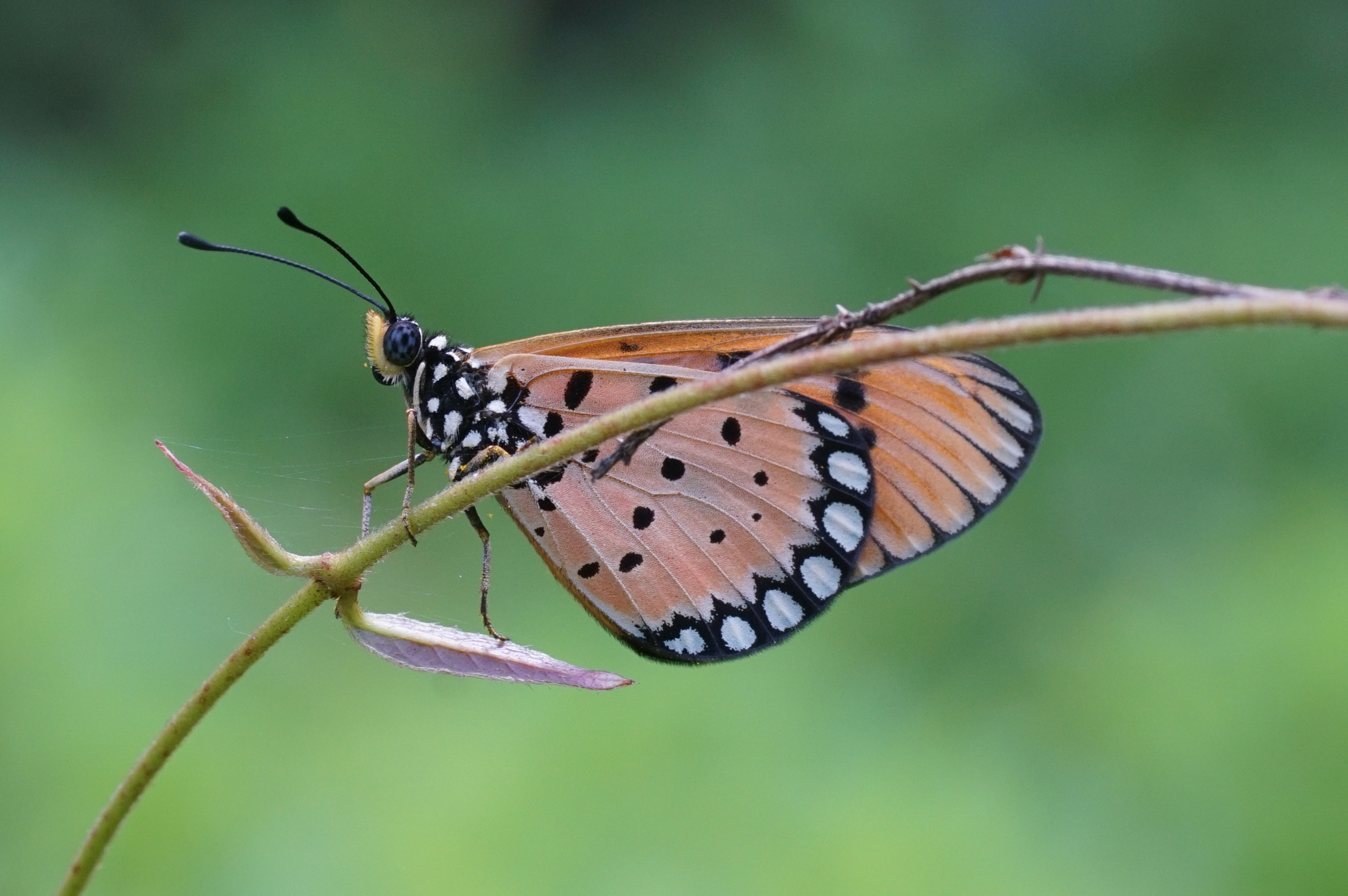
Imago (ventral view)

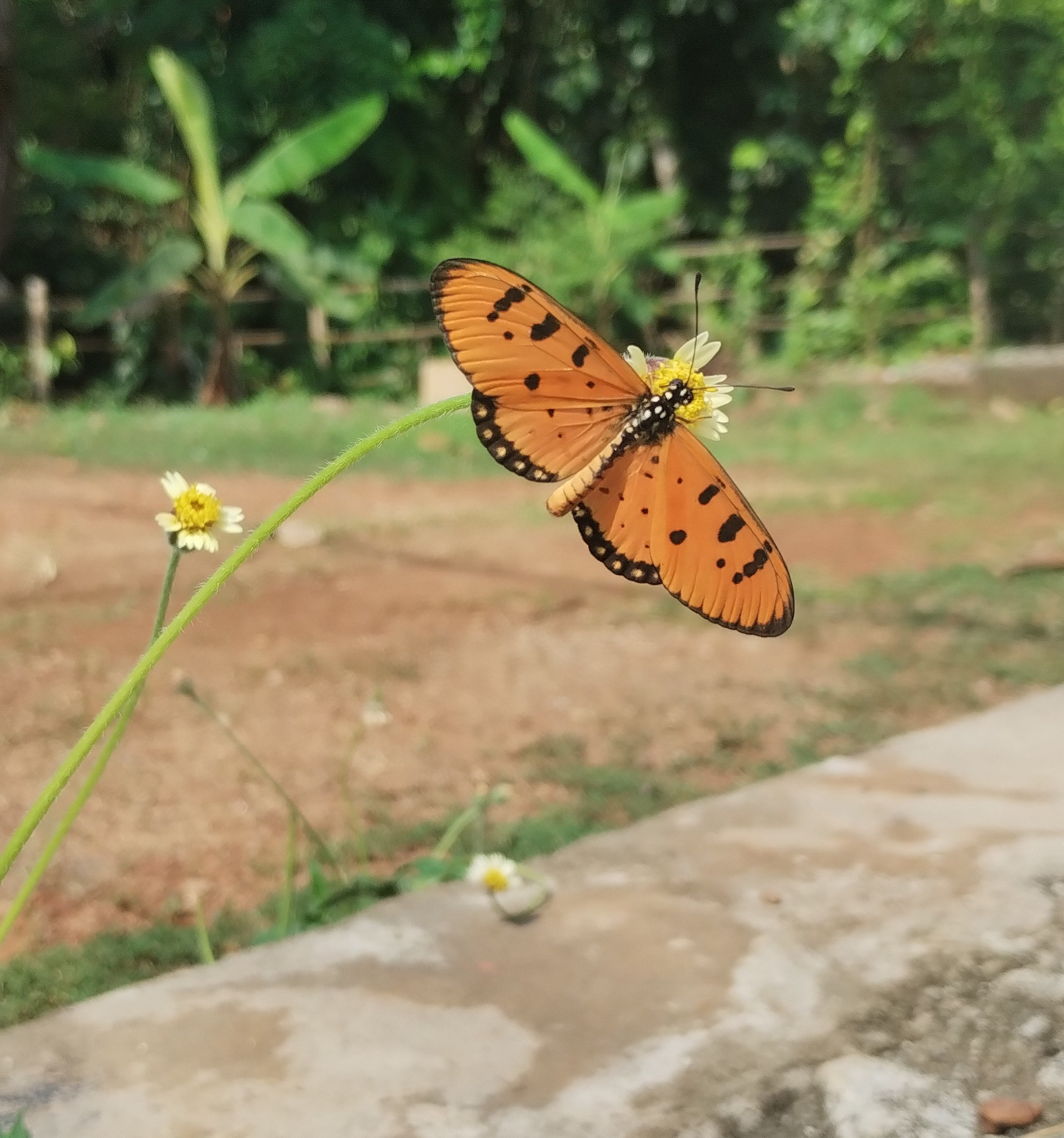

== See also ==
- List of butterflies of India
- List of butterflies of India (Nymphalidae)

== Other references ==
- Kunte, Krushnamegh (2000). Butterflies of Peninsular India. India, A Lifescape. Hyderabad, India: Universities Press. ISBN 978-8173713545.
- Wynter-Blyth, Mark Alexander (1957). Butterflies of the Indian Region. Bombay: Bombay Natural History Society. ISBN 978-8170192329.
