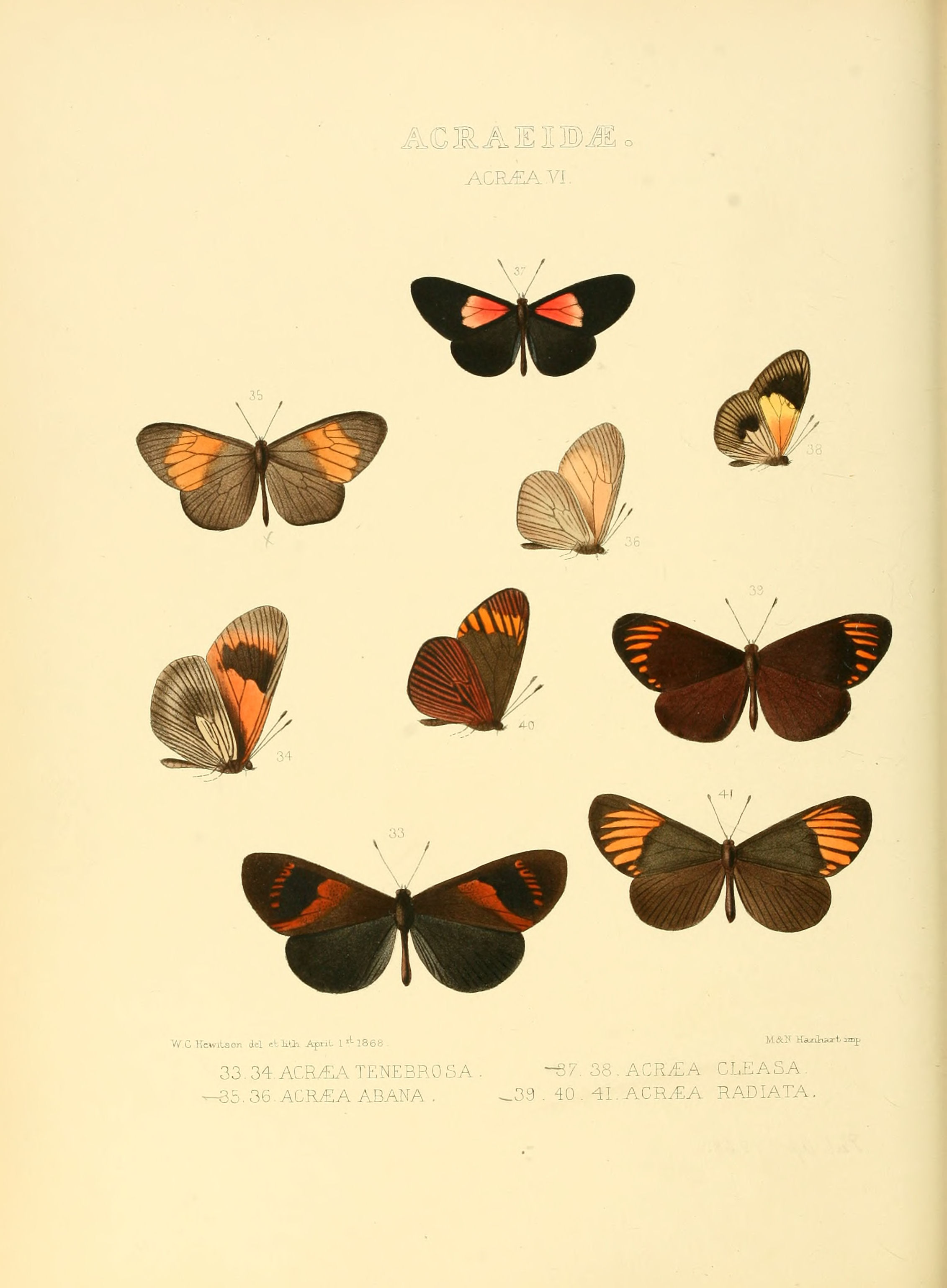
- Abananote abana figures 35 and 36; Abananote radiata figures 39, 40 and 41

Scientific classification
- Domain: Eukaryota
- Kingdom: Animalia
- Phylum: Arthropoda
- Class: Insecta
- Order: Lepidoptera
- Family: Nymphalidae
- Tribe: Acraeini
- Genus: Abananote; Potts, 1943

Abananote species groups
- See text

= Abananote =

Genus of brush-footed butterflies

Abananote is a genus of butterflies from north-western South America of the subfamily Heliconiinae in the family Nymphalidae. For taxonomic problems regarding this group, see Acraea.

== Species ==
Listed alphabetically within groups:

- abana species group
  - Abananote abana (Hewitson, 1868)
  - Abananote erinome (C. & R. Felder, 1861)
  - Abananote radiata (Hewitson, 1868)
- hylonome species group:
  - Abananote euryleuca (Jordan, 1910)
  - Abananote hylonome (Doubleday, 1844)
