= Miyana (butterfly) =

Scientific classification
- Domain: Eukaryota
- Kingdom: Animalia
- Phylum: Arthropoda
- Class: Insecta
- Order: Lepidoptera
- Family: Nymphalidae
- Tribe: Acraeini
- Genus: Miyana; Fruhstorfer, [1914]

Genus of brush-footed butterflies

Miyana is a genus of butterflies in the family Nymphalidae found in South East Asia.

== Species ==
- Miyana meyeri (Kirsch, 1877)
- Miyana moluccana (Felder, 1860)
