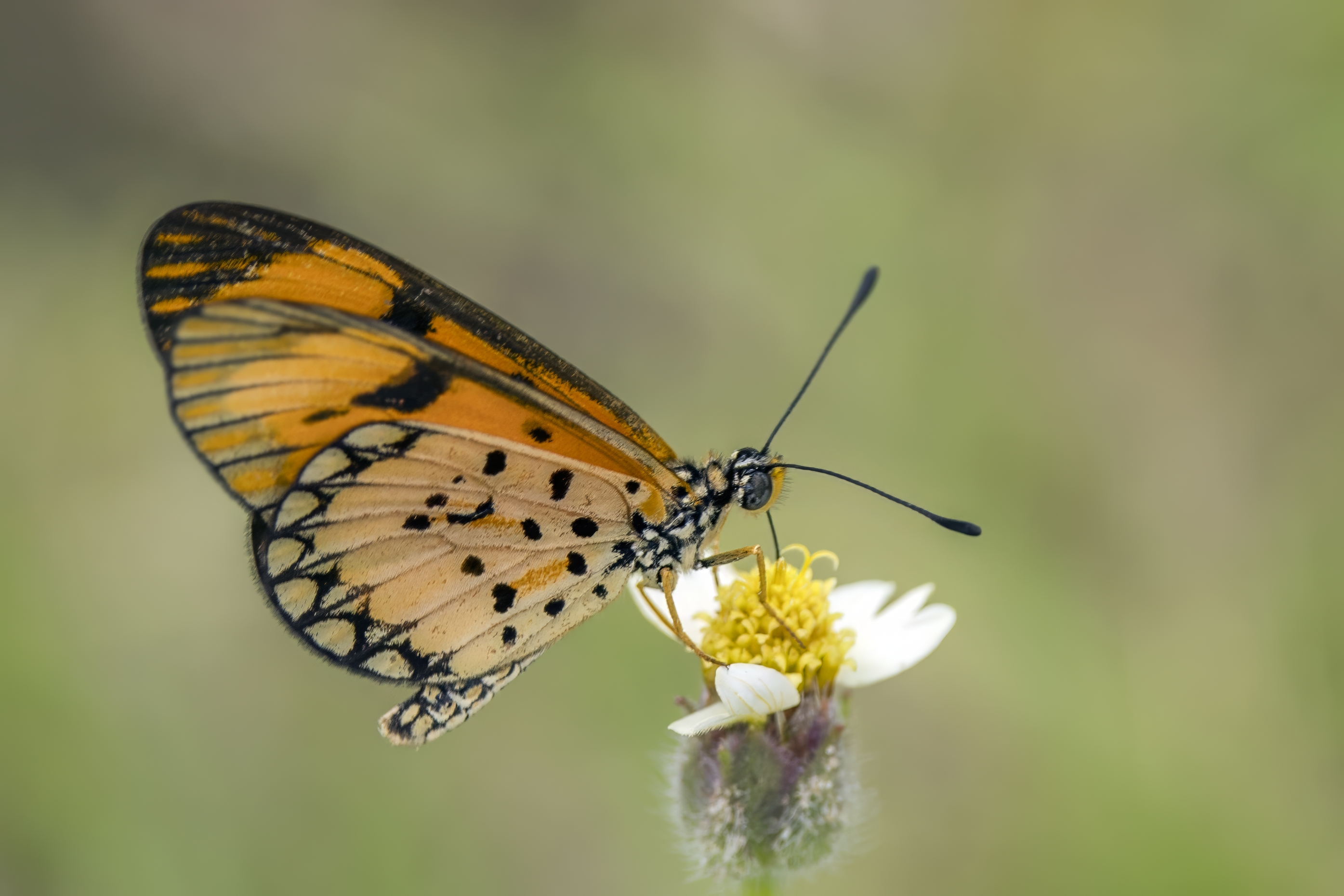
- Maputo National Park, Mozambique

Conservation status
- Least Concern (IUCN 3.1)

Scientific classification
- Kingdom: Animalia
- Phylum: Arthropoda
- Clade: Pancrustacea
- Class: Insecta
- Order: Lepidoptera
- Family: Nymphalidae
- Genus: Acraea
- Species: A. serena

Binomial name
- Acraea serena (Fabricius, 1775)

Synonyms
- Papilio serena Fabricius, 1775; Hyalites serena (Fabricius, 1775); Telchinia serena (Fabricius, 1775); Acraea (Actinote) serena; Papilio eponina Cramer, [1780]; Acraea janisca Godart, 1819; Acraea manjaca Boisduval, 1833; Acraea serena var. rougetii Guérin-Méneville, 1849; Telchinia buxtoni Butler, 1875; Telchinia perrupta Butler, 1883; Acraea subserena Grose-Smith, 1900; Acraea terpsichore aberratio form venturina Thurau, 1904; Acraea terpsichore aberratio form connexa Thurau, 1904; Acraea terpsichore aberratio form excentrica Thurau, 1904; Acraea intermediana Strand, 1911; Acraea terpsichore rougeti aberratio form contraria Strand, 1912; Acraea eliana Strand, 1912; Acraea eliana aberratio form toka Strand, 1912; Acraea terpsichore aberratio form janiscella Strand, 1913; Acraea eponina eponina f. akoafima Le Doux, 1928; Acraea eponina eponina f. latifasciata Le Doux, 1928; Acraea eponina manjaca f. reducta Le Doux, 1928; Acraea jordani Le Doux, 1928; Acraea terpsichore aberratio form bankoides Carpenter, 1935; Acraea terpsichore buxtoni aberratio form subjanisca Dufrane, 1945

= Acraea serena =

Species of butterfly

Acraea serena, the dancing acraea, is a butterfly of the family Nymphalidae. It is found throughout Africa south of the Sahara. It is the most common of the Acraea, from Dakar to Fort-Dauphin and from Yemen to the Cape.

This is the type species of the old genus Telchinia, which may warrant re-separation from Acraea. Formerly, A. serena was often misidentified as Acraea eponina (small orange acraea) or Acraea terpsicore (tawny coaster).

It is very likely that the butterfly's black-spotted orange markings are a sign of unpalatability and it may well form part of a mimicry ring with Erikssonia edgei.

== Taxonomy of Acraea manjaca Boisduval ==
Acraea manjaca from Madagascar, now considered to be conspecific with Acraea serena, has a complex taxonomic history which illustrates the problems in interpreting the genus as a whole. Here is an account of how Acraea manjaca was placed by different authors.

Boisduval notes the proximity with eponina Cramer in his original description of 1833. Doubleday (1848) treats manjaca as a good species (1848) but Guerin (1849) places manjaca in synonymy with serena Fabricius, which was confirmed by Trimen (1862) and Mabille (1886). Aurivillius (1898) considers that manjaca Boisduval is a variety of Fabricius' serena which had, in turn, been put in synonymy with terpsicore Linnaeus by Butler (1894), and which then was thought to be eponina Cramer (Le Doux, 1928, Carcasson, 1961). Eltringham (1912, 1916) considers manjaca Boisduval to be a synonym of rougeti Guérin (Acraea serena). Le Doux (1928) reinstated manjaca as good subspecies of eponina. Van Son (1963) considers manjaca to be a simple form.

Torben Larsen developed a species numbering system for his 2005 publication Butterflies of West Africa. The nominate subspecies is #1159. The 'Larsen' numbers have since been used with permission in A Sharp Eye on Butterflies of Ghana.

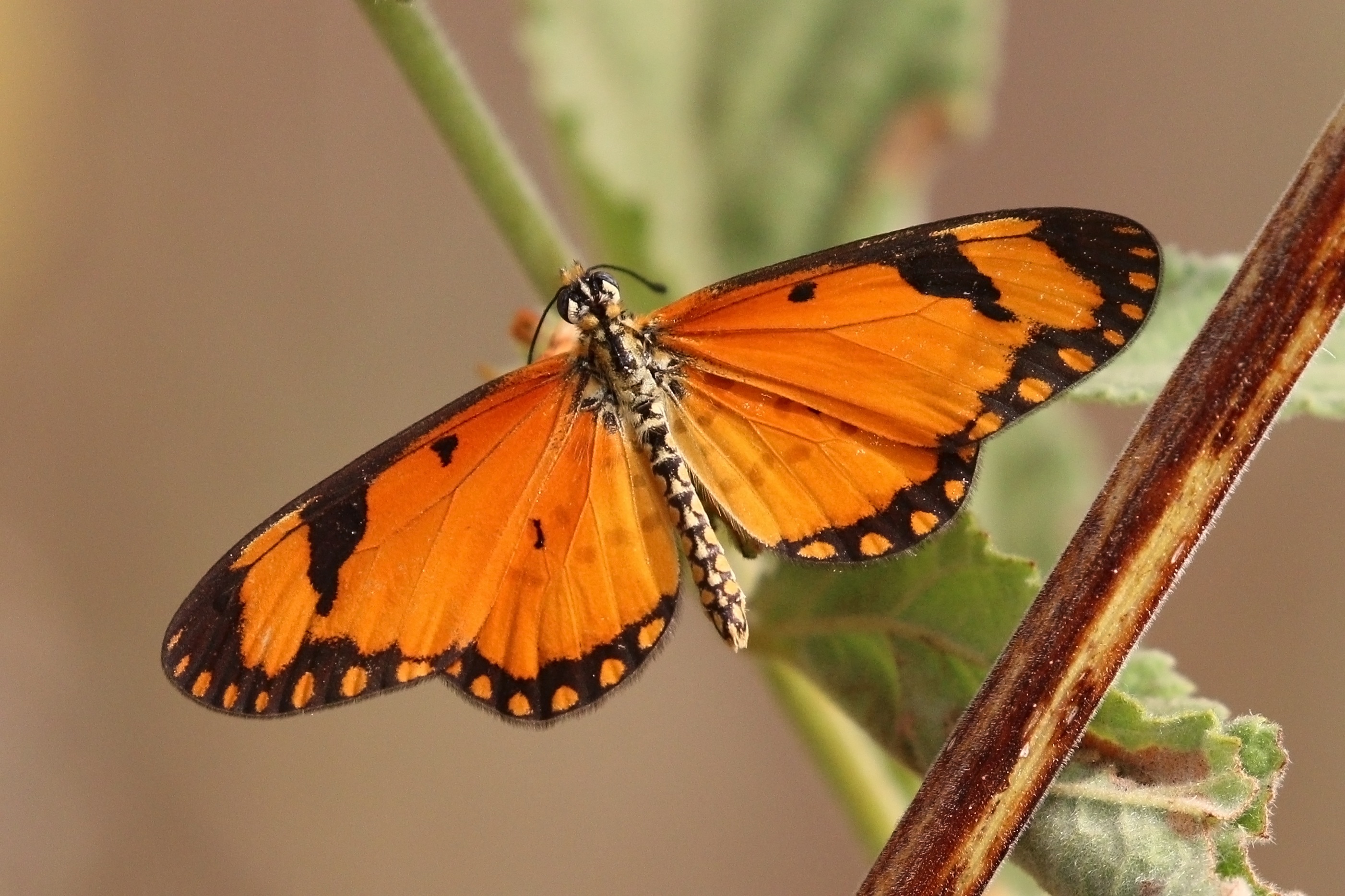
Male A. s. serena
Gambia

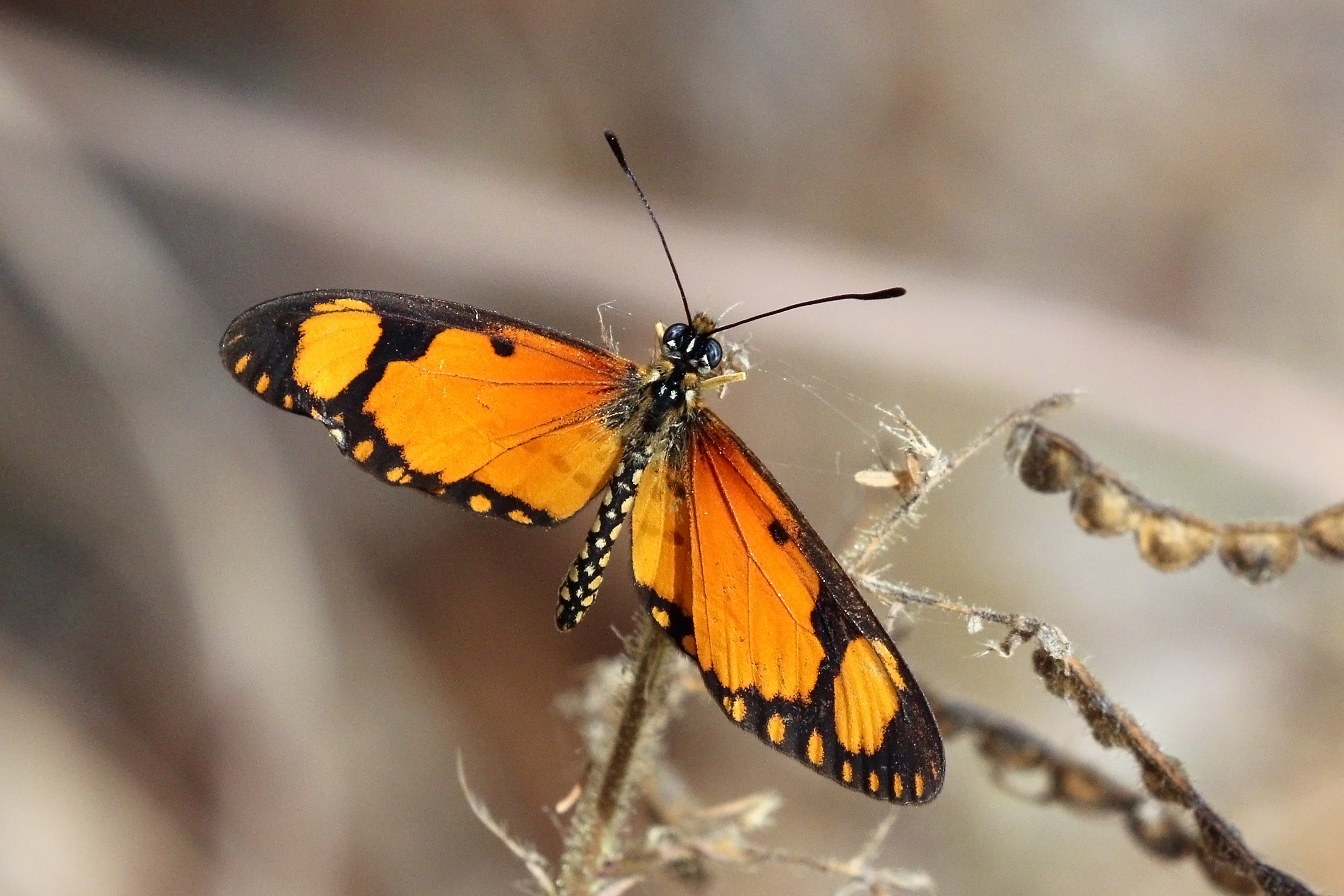
Male A. s. serena
Gambia

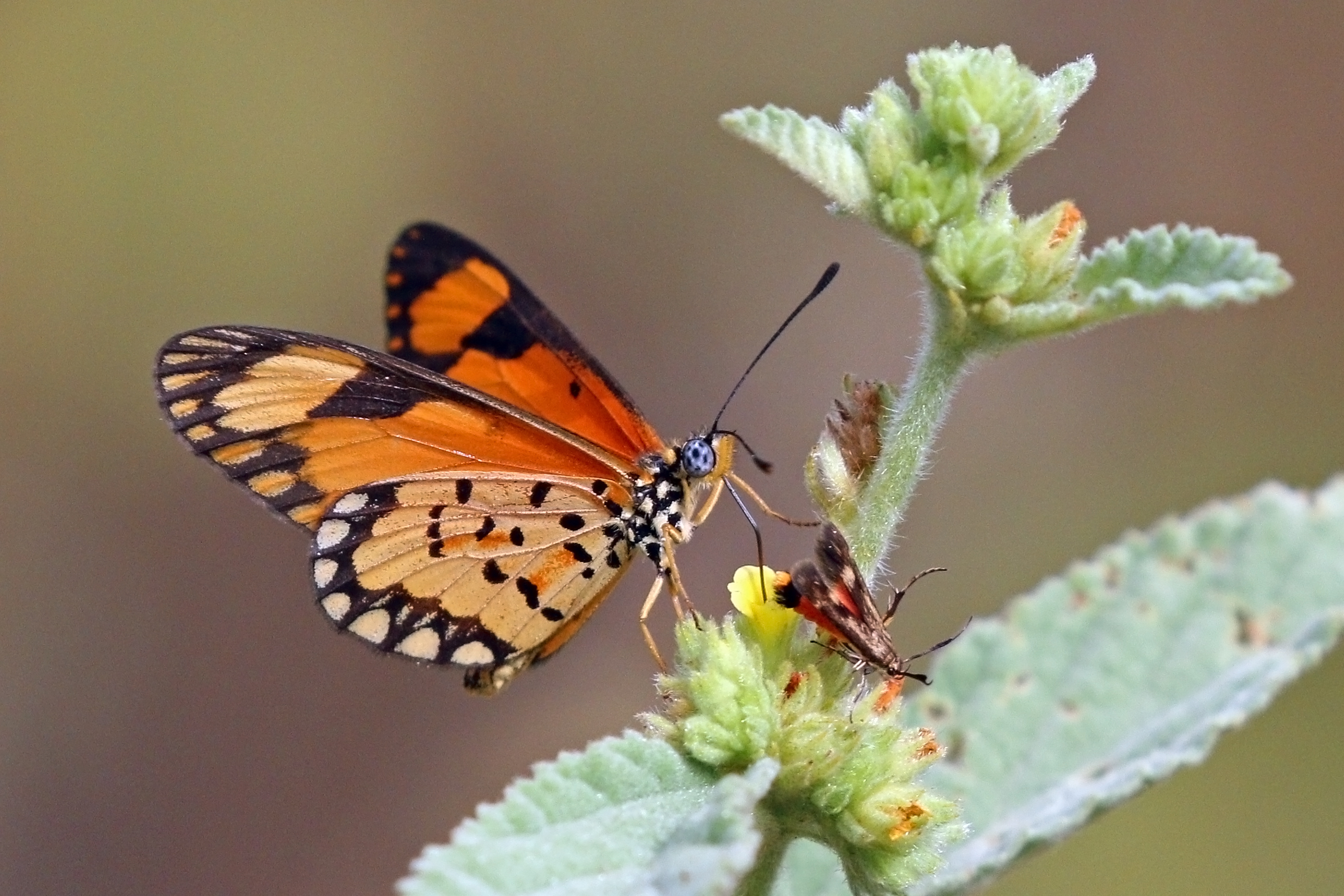
Male A. s. serena
Gambia

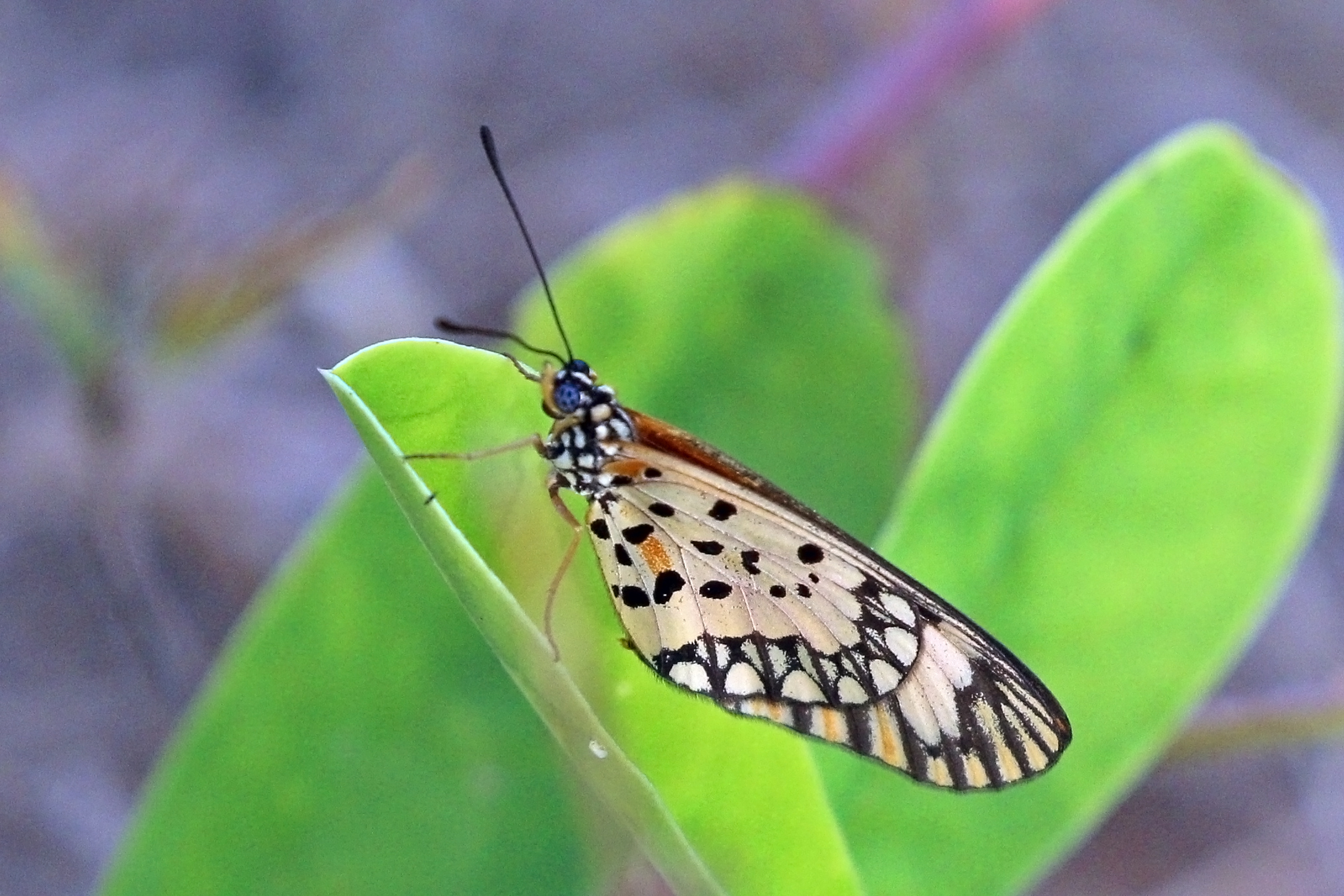
Female A. s. serena
Gambia

== Description in Seitz ==
"A. terpsichore" misident. A. serena is a common species and very variable, especially in the female; it occurs everywhere in the region except in Arabia and forms some not quite sharply defined races. In the type-form the sexes are quite similar and above coloured and marked almost exactly as in ventura (56 a); the subapical band of the forewing is completely separated from the red-yellow basal half and is red-yellow or sometimes in the female whitish; both wings above and beneath with distinct yellow marginal spots; the basal area of the hindwing beneath without red streaks or only in 1 c and the cell with a red streak between the black dots; the marginal band always without red stripes on the interneural folds. In female aberratio form janisca Godt. (the females 56 a are transitional to janisca) the red-yellow colour is replaced by dark grey and the subapical band of the forewing is usually white. - subserena Smith is similar to the form buxtoni; both wings above with sharply defined, deep black marginal bands, which on the forewing are unicolorous but on the hindwing have small light marginal spots; fore wing beneath with sharply defined, light-spotted, black marginal band; hindwing beneath with a few black dots in the basal part and with sharply defined black, light-spotted marginal band; subapical band of the forewing completely united with the basal area, en closing a quadrate black spot at the end of the cell. Sierra Leone. - rougeti Guer. (= eliana Strand) has like the type-form, large light marginal spots on both wings above, but differs in the forewing having beneath at the distal margin only sharply prominent black vein-ends and no proximally defined light marginal spots, the light ground-colour reaching the distal margin between the veins without interruption; the light subapical band of the forewing is sometimes separate, sometimes united with the light basal part; basally straight and cut off almost vertically to the costal margin. Was described from specimens from Abyssinia, but occurs almost identically also in South and East Africa and on Madagascar. Females with almost transparent, whitish ground-colour on both wings may be called female aberratio form manjaca Bdv. They occur especially on Madagascar - buxtoni Btlr. (56 a, as rougeti) closely approximates to rougeti, only differing in having the light marginal spots on the upperside of the forewing smaller or indistinct and the marginal band of the forewing deeper black and irregularly defined proximally; the subapical band of the forewing joined to the light basal half at vein 4. South and East Africa.

In aberratio form melas Oberth. the wings are unicolorous black with an irregular white spot instead of the subapical band of the forewing and beneath only relieved with yellowish at the distal margin and at the base.

Aberratio form connexa Thur. has the distal black dot in the cell of the hindwing joined to the median dots. German East Africa.

Aberratio form excentrica Thur. differs in having discal dots 3 to 6 on the underside of the hindwing placed much nearer to the distal margin than usual, elongated and sometimes almost reaching the marginal band. German East Africa. Aberratio form toka Strand closely approximates to typical rougeti, only differing materially in having the proximal boundary-line of the marginal band on the underside of the hindwing black instead of reddish. Abyssinia.

Aberratio form intermediana Strand is another nearly allied aberration to rougeti, distinguished by the strong development of the red basal streak and the somewhat broader marginal band on the hindwing beneath. German East Africa. How Strand, who has access to the extensive material of the Berlin Museum, could regard intermediana and eliana (rougeti ) as independent species, is difficult to explain, as they obviously intergrade without sharp delimitation into the other terpsichore forms and are only characterized by trifling differences.

Aberratio form contraria Strand is described as follows: "The red spots in the marginal band on the upper surface of both wings are only quite weakly indicated, hence at a cursory glance the band appears unicolorous; on the underside of the hindwing some of the black spots in the basal area are smaller, namely those of the distal and inner-marginal rows, and in addition the distal round spot in the cell is so small as to be almost obsolete. In the distal transverse row only 5 spots are present, namely those in cellules 1 b, 1 c, 2, 4 and 7, of which the one in cellule 4 is punctiform. The bordering of the black marginal spots is so broad that the black interspaces are as broad, as the spots themselves. Beyond the black transverse spot on the underside of the forewing, which as usual is confluent with the costal margin, there is no further, smaller, black spot". German East Africa. Evidently an extreme aberration of buxtoni.

Aberratio form venturina Thur. forms a transition to the following race; the underside of the hindwing has between the basal and discal dots red streaks in 1 c, 7 and in the cell; the marginal band is, however of uniform breadth with marginal spots of almost equal size, which at their proximal end have at most a reddish dot or spot. Uganda.

== Taxonomy ==
It is a member of the Acraea bonasia species group.

Pierre & Bernaud, 2014

- Acraea (Actinote) groupe serena sub group bonasia Pierre & Bernaud, 2014
