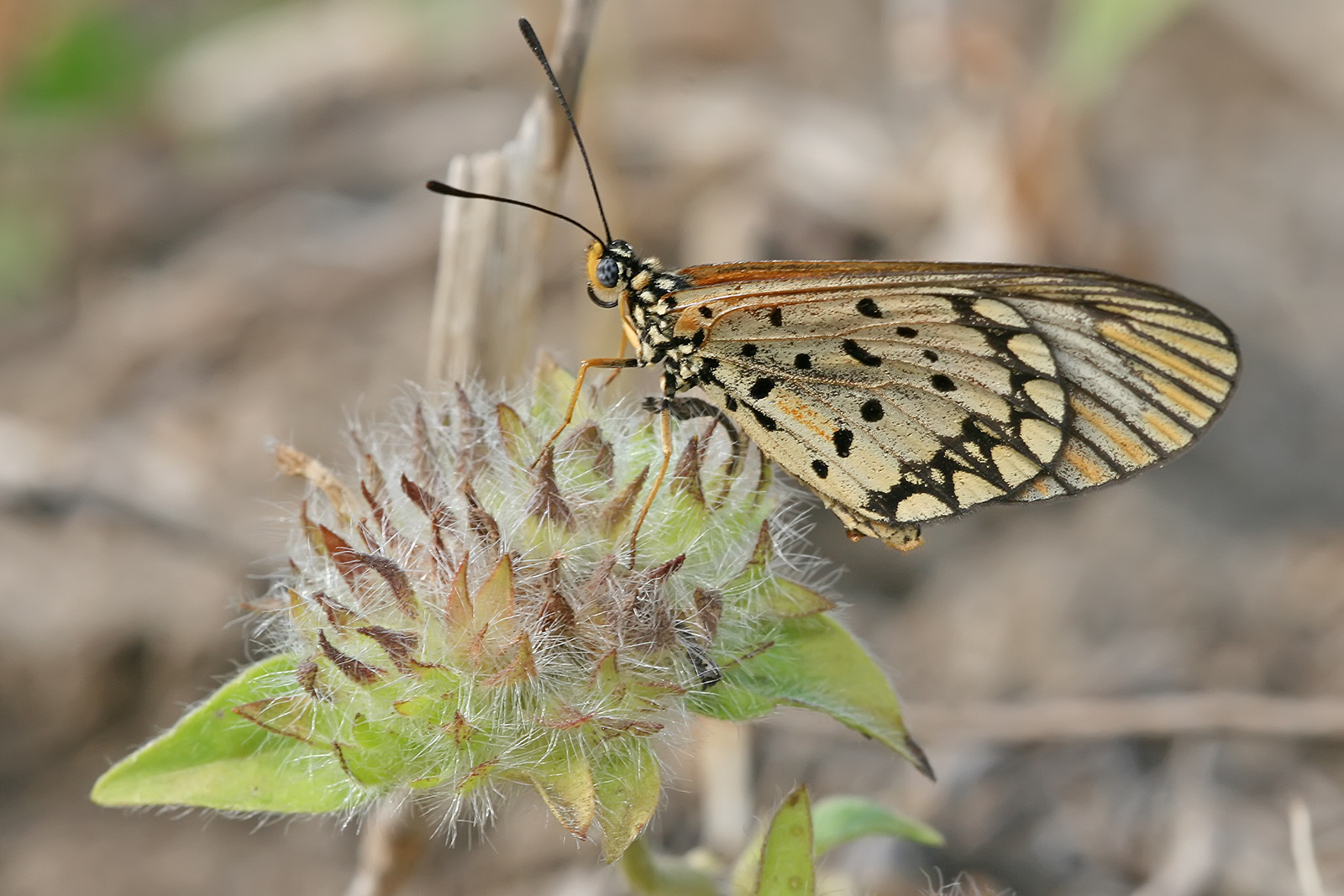
- Acraea eponina

Scientific classification
- Kingdom: Animalia
- Phylum: Arthropoda
- Clade: Pancrustacea
- Class: Insecta
- Order: Lepidoptera
- Family: Nymphalidae
- Subfamily: Heliconiinae
- Tribe: Acraeini; Boisduval, 1833

Genera
- See text

= Acraeini =

Tribe in butterfly subfamily Heliconiinae

The Acraeini are a tribe of butterflies of the subfamily Heliconiinae in the family Nymphalidae.

== Genera ==
The recognized genera are:

- Abananote Potts, 1943
- Acraea Fabricius, 1807 – acraeas
- Actinote Hübner, [1819] – actinotes
- Altinote Potts, 1943 – altinotes
- Bematistes Hemming, 1935
- Cethosia Fabricius, 1807 – lacewings
- Miyana Fruhstorfer, 1914
- Telchinia Hübner, [1819]

The genus Acraea is highly paraphyletic and needs to be redelimited. This will possibly re-establish the old genus Telchinia, and perhaps others.

The genus Pardopsis Trimen, 1887, previously included in Acraeini, has tentatively been moved to the Argynnini tribe.
