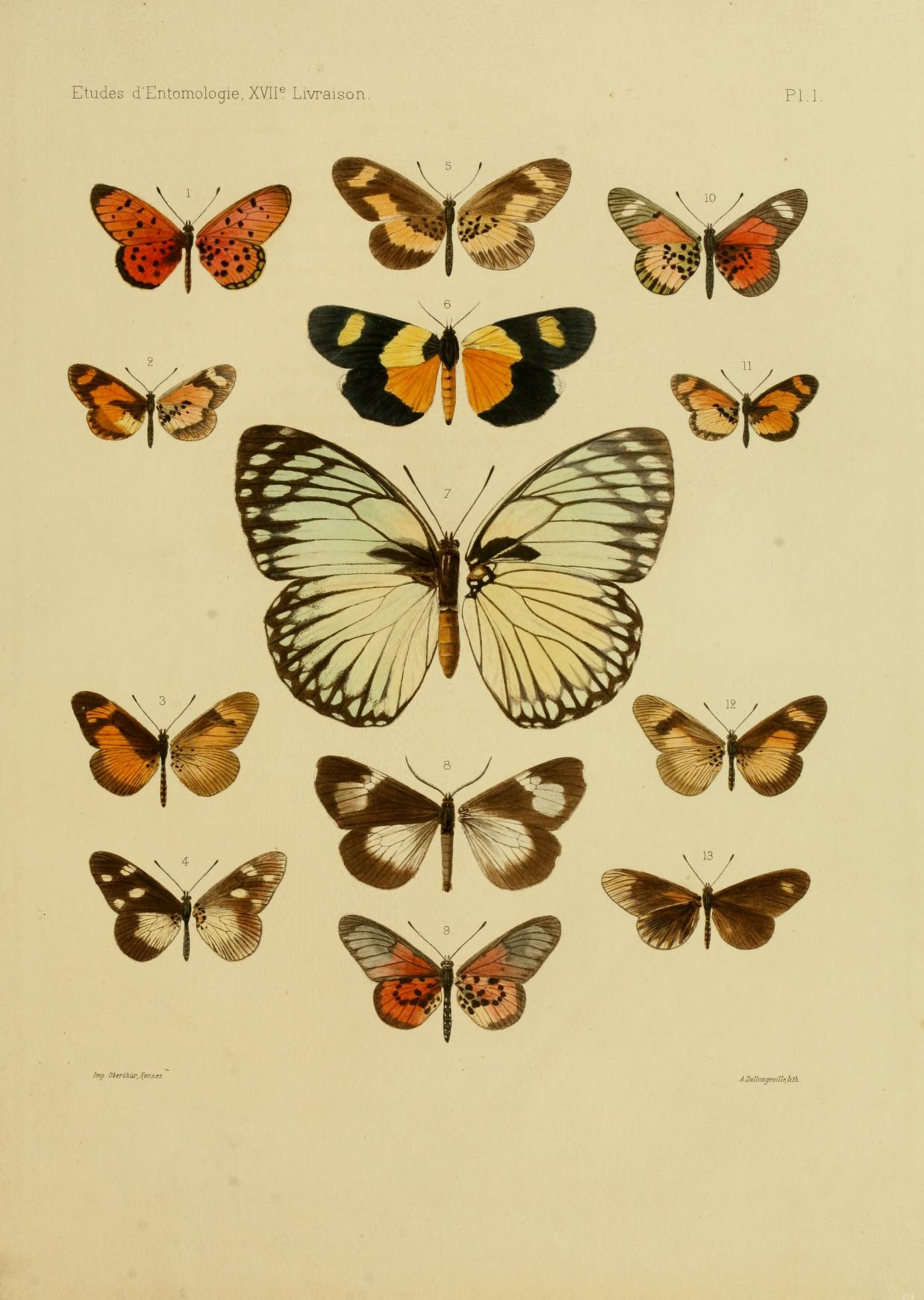
- Figure 12

Scientific classification
- Kingdom: Animalia
- Phylum: Arthropoda
- Class: Insecta
- Order: Lepidoptera
- Family: Nymphalidae
- Genus: Acraea
- Species: A. ventura

Binomial name
- Acraea ventura Hewitson, 1877

Synonyms
- Acraea (Actinote) ventura; Acraea serena ab. melas Oberthür, 1893; Acraea ochrascens Sharpe, 1902; Acraea terpsichore var. bukoba Weymer, 1903

= Acraea ventura =

Species of butterfly

Acraea ventura is a butterfly in the family Nymphalidae. It is found in Malawi, Tanzania, Zambia, the Democratic Republic of the Congo, Angola, Uganda, Rwanda, Burundi and Kenya.

== Description ==
ventura Hew. (= bukoba Weym.) (55 a) is very similar above to a typical Acraea serena or serena form rougeti and has usually a free subapical band on the forewing, with the spots in 4 and 5 much prolonged distally; beneath the forewing has at the distal margin sharply prominent black veins and saffron-yellow streaks on the interneural folds; it is characterized by the under surface of the hindwing; this has thick, sharply defined, bright red streaks in the cell and in cellules 1 c and 7 between the basal and the discal dots and occasionally similar streaks in other cellules also; the yellow marginal spots are very large and proximally produced into red streaks, which are much longer in cellules 1 c to 3 than in cellules 4 and 5; the proximal ends of the red streaks are connected by a dark line which bounds the light median band distally; thus the median band is not of almost uniform breadth, but in cellules 4 and 5 strongly convex towards the base. In the female the ground-colour of the upper surface is grey-yellow and the red streaks in the marginal band of the hindwing beneath are often absent. Southern Congo; Nyassaland; German and British East Africa; Uganda. - ochrascens E. Sharpe nearly agrees with ventura in markings, but has the ground-colour of both wings light yellowish white, and the subapical band of the forewing united with the ground-colour. Victoria Nyanza: Buka Bay.

== Biology ==
The habitat consists of marshy areas.

The larvae feed on Cassia species.

== Subspecies ==
- Acraea ventura ventura (Malawi, southern Tanzania, northern Zambia, Democratic Republic of the Congo: Shaba, Angola)
- Acraea ventura ochrascens Sharpe, 1902 (Democratic Republic of the Congo: Kivu, Uganda, Rwanda, Burundi, western Kenya, north-western Tanzania)

== Taxonomy ==
Acraea ventura is a member of the Acraea bonasia species group; see Acraea.See also Pierre & Bernaud, 2014
