= Acraea anacreon =

- Acraea anacreon and related species

Scientific classification
- Kingdom: Animalia
- Phylum: Arthropoda
- Clade: Pancrustacea
- Class: Insecta
- Order: Lepidoptera
- Family: Nymphalidae
- Genus: Acraea
- Species: A. anacreon

Binomial name
- Acraea anacreon Trimen, 1868

Synonyms
- Hyalites anacreon (Trimen, 1868); Telchinia anacreon (Trimen, 1868)

Species of butterfly

Acraea anacreon, the (large) orange acraea, is a butterfly of the family Nymphalidae. It is found in Kwazulu-Natal and Transvaal and from Angola to Zimbabwe and to Kenya. Elsewhere in Africa and adjacent regions, "orange acraea" refers to the smaller A. eponina.

== Description ==
The wingspan is 40–50 mm for males and 45–55 mm for females. A. anacreon Trim. (55 a). Wings above in the male orange-yellow, in the female grey-yellow to violet-grey, often darker on the forewing; both wings above with dark marginal band, which encloses large, light, sharply defined marginal spots; the veins at the proximal side of the marginal bands distinctly thickened with black; the black dot in the cell of the hindwing is always placed in the distal half of the cell; the hindwing beneath with light yellow ground-colour, at the base of cellules 1 c and 8 always red, often also with red spots in the other cellules between the black dots. The discal dots in 4 to 6 of the forewing are well developed and the ground-colour sometimes much lighter beyond them. South Africa to the Transvaal, Nyassaland and German East Africa. - anacreontica Smith [now species Acraea anacreontica] (55 b?) is very similar to the type-form, but differs in the lighter ground-colour of the upper surface, smaller discal dots and better developed red spots between the black dots on the underside of the hindwing. British East Africa. - bomba Smith [ now species Acraea bomba ] differs in the forewing above having a black apical spot 4 to 8 mm. in breadth, not or indistinctly spotted, and lacking discal dots (3) 4 to 6. In the dry-season form the apical spot of the forewing is only about 4 mm. in breadth and the wings above are not darkened at the base; in the rainy-season form, induna Trim. (55 b), on the other hand, the apical spot of the forewing is 7 to 8 mm. in breadth and the wings, especially the hindwing, are broadly blackish at the base above. Angola and Rhodesia to British East Africa. - speciosa Wichgr. has the ground-colour of the upper surface brighter brown-red and the marginal band of the fore wing above is only indicated by the thickened black veins; the under surface brightly coloured with well developed red spots on the hindwing; otherwise agreeing with the type-form. Angola.

== Subspecies ==
- Acraea speciosa Wichgraf, 1909 subspecies according to Pierre & Bernau, 2014

== Biology ==
Adults are on wing from October to May, with a peak in February. There are usually multiple generations per year, but only one (with adults on wing in February) in high mountains.

The larvae feed on Cliffortia linearifolia, Aeschynomene and Adenia species.

== Taxonomy ==
It is a member of the Acraea rahira species group.- but see also Pierre & Bernaud, 2014
