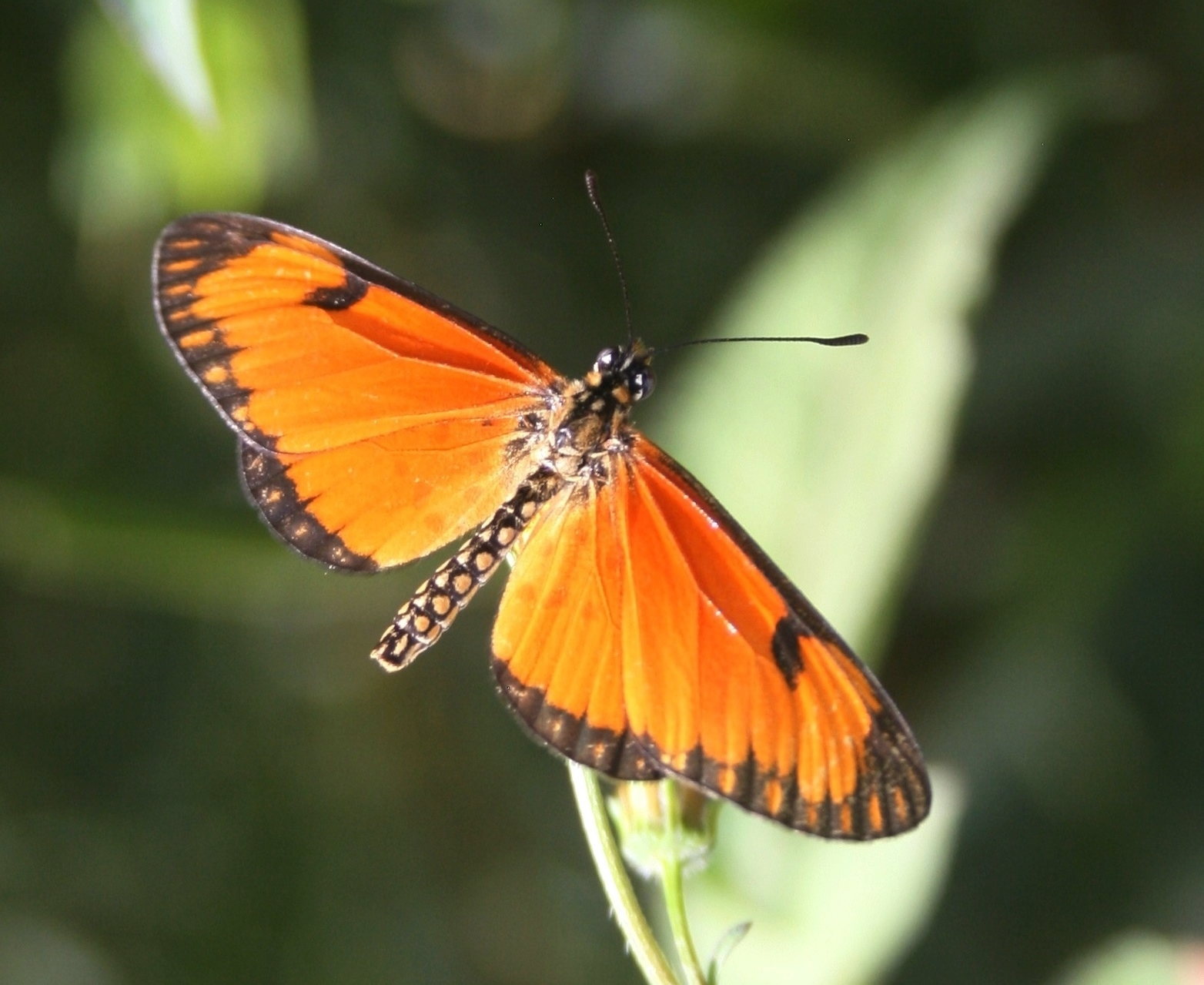

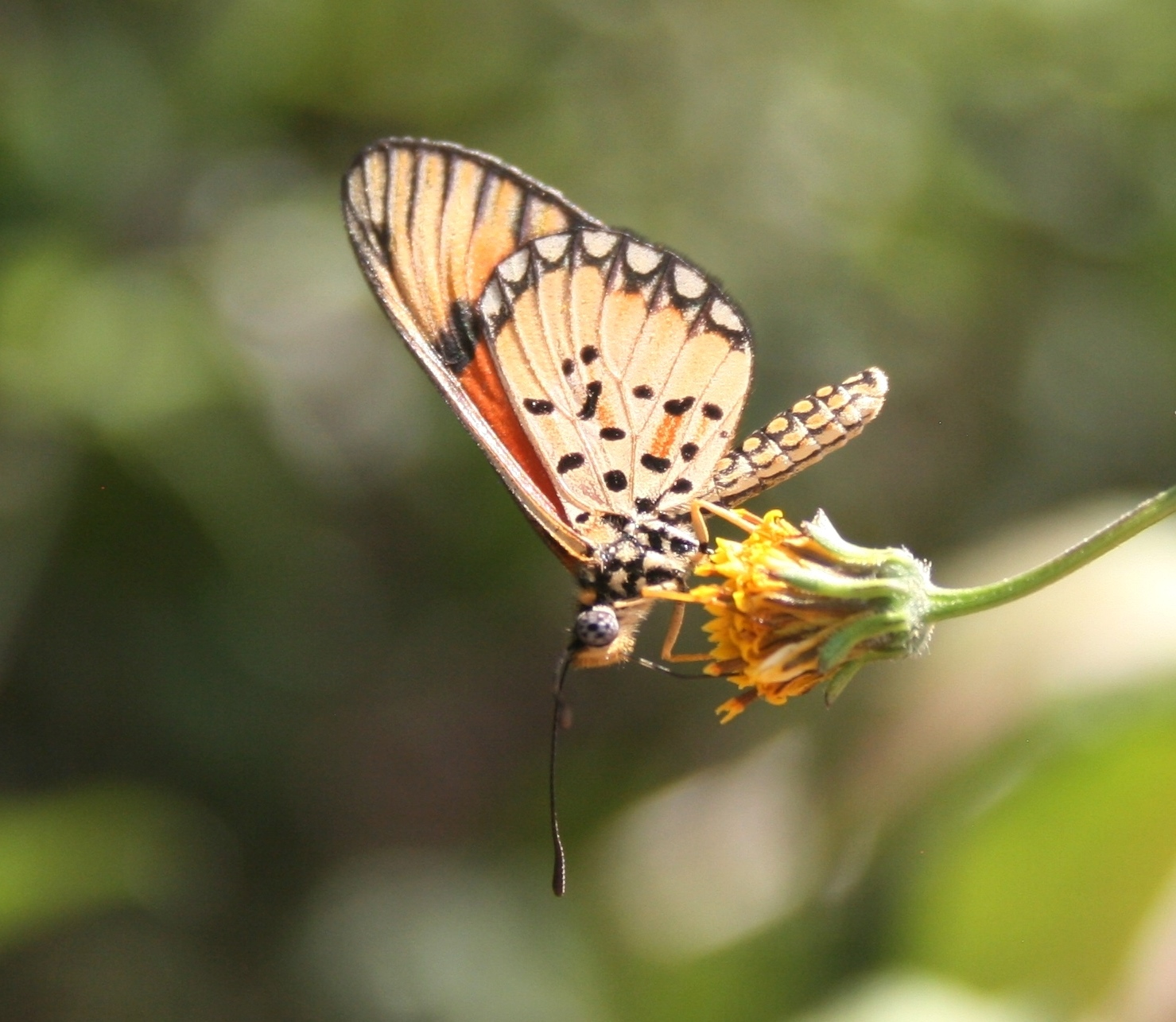
- A. e. manjaca in South Africa

Scientific classification
- Kingdom: Animalia
- Phylum: Arthropoda
- Class: Insecta
- Order: Lepidoptera
- Family: Nymphalidae
- Genus: Acraea
- Species: A. eponina

Binomial name
- Acraea eponina (Cramer, 1780)

Synonyms
- Acraea manjaca Boisduval, 1833; Hyalites eponina (Cramer, 1780); Papilio eponina Cramer, 1780; Telchinia perrupta Butler, 1883

= Acraea eponina =

Small orange acraea

Species of butterfly

Acraea eponina, the orange acraea or small orange acraea to distinguish it from the larger A. anacreon, is a butterfly of the family Nymphalidae. It is found in tropical Africa and south-western Arabia.

The wingspan is 35–40 mm for males and 36–44 mm for females. Adults are on wing year round, but are more common in warmer months.

Natural enemies include the parasitoids Carcelia normula and Charops species and the predaceous bugs Afrius figuratus, Rhynocoris bicolor and other Rhynocoris species.

The larvae of subspecies eponina feed on Hibiscus, Sida, Nicotiana, Hermannia, and Triumfetta species. Subspecies manjaca has been reported on Triumfetta rhomboidea, Triumfetta annua, Triumfetta effusa, Triumfetta pilosa and Hermannia species.

The Acraea E. larvae is known to be a major pest to the plant Jute Mallow and can cause a loss of 25-100% of the quality of the crop harvest.

== Subspecies ==
- Acraea eponina eponina (Tropical Africa, south-western Arabia)
- Acraea eponina manjaca (Natal, Eswatini, Transvaal, Rhodesia, Mozambique). Now a synonym of Acraea serena

== Taxonomy ==
Acraea eponina is a member of the Acraea bonasia species group; see Acraea. Formerly, A. eponina was often misidentified as Acraea serena or Acraea terpsicore.
