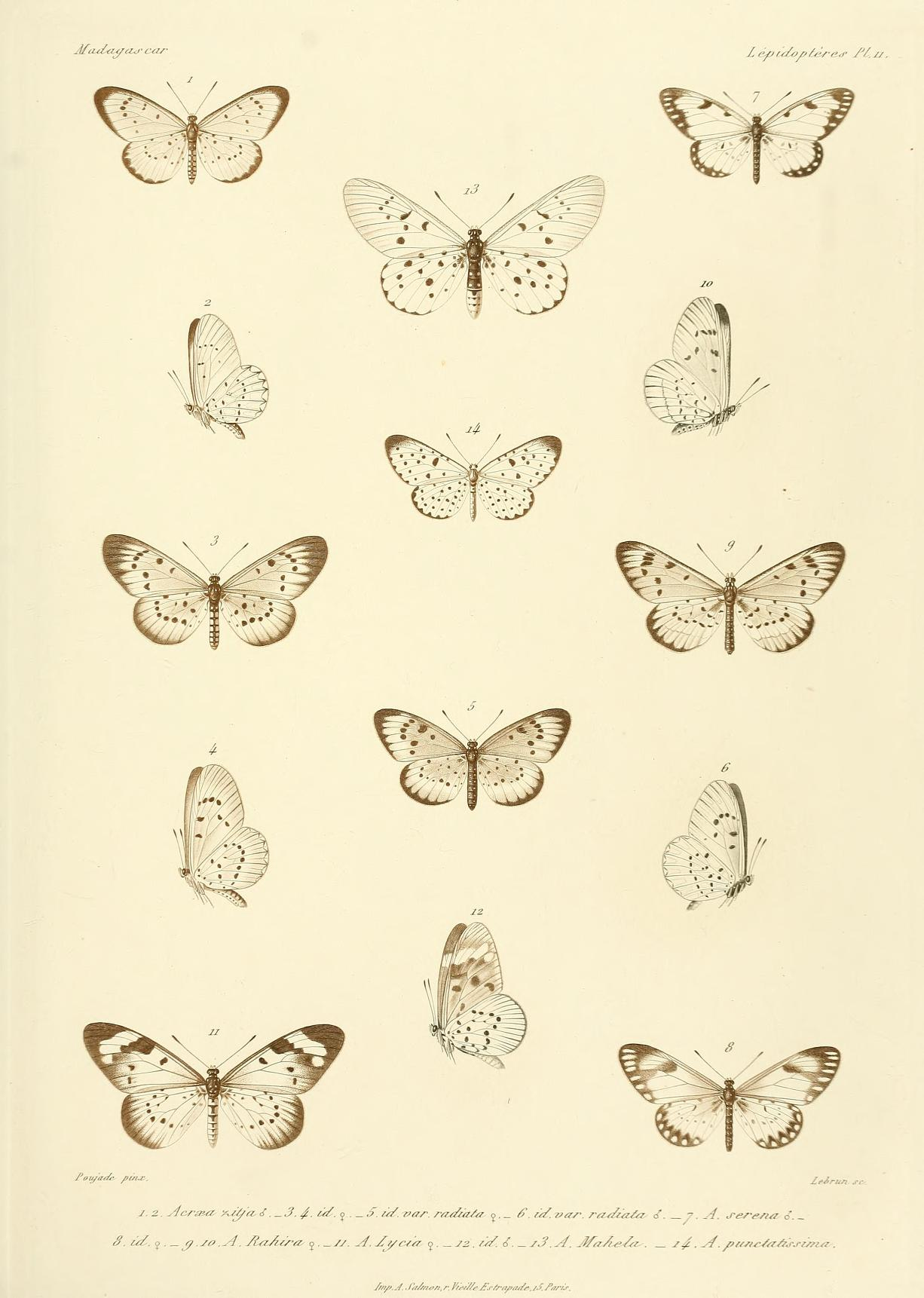

Scientific classification
- Kingdom: Animalia
- Phylum: Arthropoda
- Class: Insecta
- Order: Lepidoptera
- Family: Nymphalidae
- Genus: Acraea
- Species: A. rahira

Binomial name
- Acraea rahira Boisduval, 1833

Synonyms
- Hyalites rahira (Boisduval, 1833); Telchinia rahira (Boisduval, 1833); Acraea rahira uasingishuensis Stoneham, 1943; Acraea (Actinote) rahira; Acraea rahira f. melanoradiata Stoneham, 1943; Acraea rahira f. crippsi Stoneham, 1943

= Acraea rahira =

Marsh acraea

Species of butterfly

Acraea rahira, the marsh acraea, is a butterfly of the family Nymphalidae. It is found in southern Africa. In South Africa it is found from the Western Cape along the coast to the Eastern Cape and KwaZulu-Natal, then inland to Mpumalanga, Gauteng, Limpopo and North West.

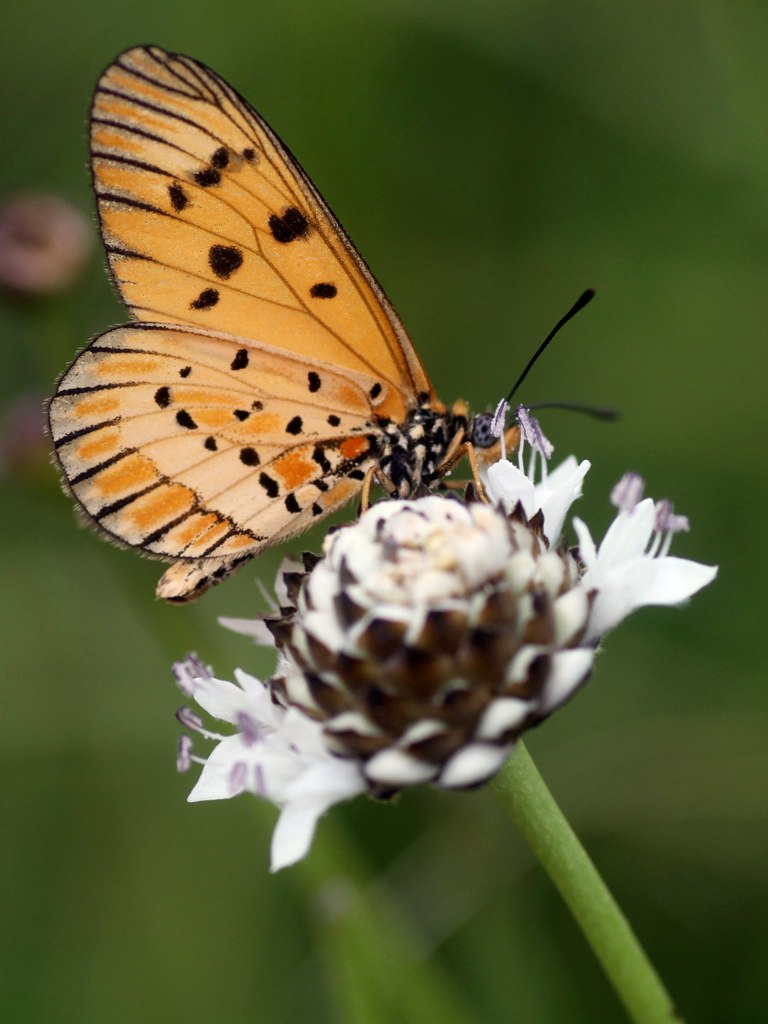

== Description ==
The wingspan is 35–40 mm for males and 40–50 mm for females. A. rahira Bdv. (55 g). Both wings above light grey-yellow (male) or light grey (female); the veins in the distal part edged with black and at the distal margin widened into long triangular or rounded spots; basal and discal dots free and distinct; discal dots 1 b to 5 on the hindwing placed in an almost straight line and discal dots 6 and 7 forming nearly a right angle with them. The under surface is similar to the upper, only somewhat lighter and with reddish streaks in 1 b, 1 c and the cell between the basal and discal dots; distally to the discal dots runs in la to 5 a whitish transverse band about 2 mm. in breadth, which is basally bounded by a dark line; this line terminates at vein 5 or 6 and is more or less indicated on the upper surface also; it evidently corresponds to the proximal boundary of the marginal band; the latter scarcely differs from the ground-colour or has some reddish streaks on the interneural folds; at the distal margin the ground-colour is even lighter yellow, without, however, forming distinct marginal spots, the proximal boundary of the spots being entirely absent or only very indistinct. - Larva blackish with the thoracic legs yellow, a yellow lateral line and a white dorsal line; the spines are short, yellow, placed in yellow spots; head also yellow; lives on Erigeron. Pupa whitish with black markings. This very distinct species is fond of damp and marshy places and occurs in the whole of South Africa to Angola and Rhodesia.

== Subspecies ==
- Acraea rahira rahira (southern Africa, Zimbabwe, Mozambique to Malawi, southern Tanzania, Zambia, southern Zaire (Shaba), Angola, western Kenya, Uganda)
- Acraea rahira mufindi Kielland, 1990 (Tanzania)

== Biology ==
Adults are on wing year round in warmer areas, with a peak from September to April. In cooler areas it is only found in the hot summer months. The larvae feed on Persicaria attenuata africana and Conyza canadensis.

== Taxonomy ==
It is a member of the Acraea rahira species group - but see also Pierre & Bernaud, 2014
