= Acraea trimeni =

Trimen's acraea

Conservation status
- Least Concern (IUCN 3.1)

Scientific classification
- Kingdom: Animalia
- Phylum: Arthropoda
- Class: Insecta
- Order: Lepidoptera
- Family: Nymphalidae
- Genus: Acraea
- Species: A. trimeni

Binomial name
- Acraea trimeni Aurivillius, 1899

Synonyms
- Acraea zetes trimeni; Acraea barberi ab. or var. trimeni Aurivillius, 1899; Acraea (Acraea) trimeni; Acraea zetes barberi f. eros Le Doux, 1923; Acraea zetes trimeni f. nigromacula Le Doux, 1931

Species of butterfly

Acraea trimeni or Trimen's acraea is a butterfly of the family Nymphalidae. It is found in only in the arid savannah in the northern Northern Cape and the western part of the Free State.

The wingspan is 43–49 mm for males and 45–55 mm for females. Adults are usually on wing from October to March with a peak in late October. There might be two or continuous generations per year.

== Taxonomy ==
The status of this species is uncertain. Acraea trimeni was described as a form or aberration of Acraea barberi. Aurivillius (1898) is uncertain as to whether trimeni is an aberration or variety of barberi Trimen. Eltringham (1912) retains the rank of aberration of barberi Trimen. Van Son (1963) considers trimeni as a subspecies of zetes. In his phylogenetic analysis of 1992–1993, Henning considers the Aurivillius description as a good species, but trimeni may be a synonym of barberi.

Eltringham's text reads "In the example named ab. trimeni by Aurivillius the apical yellow is more pronounced, and the forewing hind marginal black is almost absent. Aurivillius includes under this an example from Rehoboth (German W. Africa) which is now in the Staudinger collection. If this is really barberi then the hypoleuca of Trimen must also be a form of zetes which indeed is highly probable. Extremely different in appearance though it is. I have in fact only kept hypoleuca separate from zetes because it is so far a unique example and bears no locality. The example labelled barberi in the Staudinger collection differs very little from it. (See remarks under A. hypoleuca)".

== Taxonomy ==
It is a member of the Acraea zetes species group - but see also Pierre & Bernaud, 2014

== Etymology ==
The specific name honours Roland Trimen.
