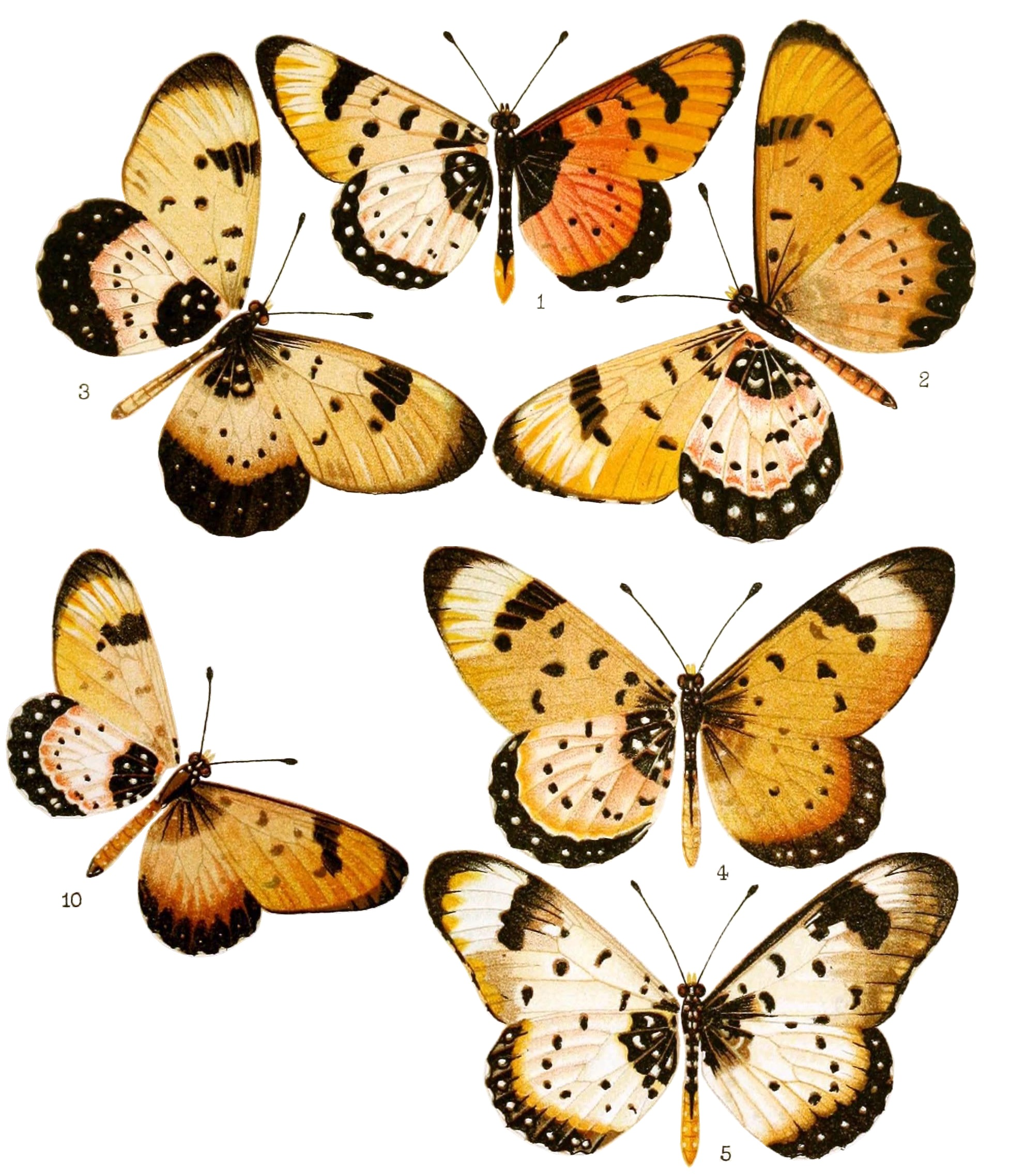
- A. pseudolycia forms and subspecies

Scientific classification
- Kingdom: Animalia
- Phylum: Arthropoda
- Class: Insecta
- Order: Lepidoptera
- Family: Nymphalidae
- Genus: Acraea
- Species: A. pseudolycia

Binomial name
- Acraea pseudolycia Butler, 1874

Synonyms
- Acraea (Acraea) pseudolycia; Acraea astrigera f. brunnea Eltringham, 1911; Acraea astrigera Butler, 1899; Acraea emini Weymer, 1903; Acraea pseudolycia astrigera f. auasa Gabriel, 1949

= Acraea pseudolycia =

Species of butterfly

Acraea pseudolycia is a butterfly in the family Nymphalidae, which is native to East Africa and Africa's southern subtropics.

== Range ==
It is found in Angola, the Democratic Republic of the Congo, Zambia, Kenya, Tanzania, Malawi, Uganda, Sudan and Ethiopia.

== Description ==
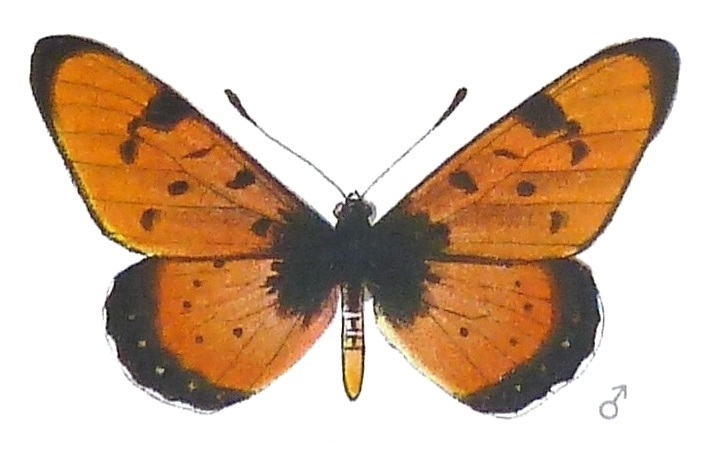
Acraea pseudolycia f. astrigera in Seitz's Fauna Africana Taf. 60

A. pseudolycia can scarcely be distinguished by any constant external characters from zetes, but according to Eltringham, the lateral clasps of the male are somewhat differently formed. All the forms most nearly approximate to the race acara and give the impression of an extreme development of this. The light groundcolour is more extended on the upper surface of both wings and the marginal spots of the forewing above are either entirely absent (being united with the ground-colour) or are small and placed in a greyish nebulous band which is not sharply defined; on the under the surface, they are never bounded proximally by a black lunulate line and are usually entirely absent; discal dots of both wings on an average smaller than in acara.

- pseudolycia Btlr. (60 f). Ground-colour of both wings whitish; forewing above at the distal margin with a black-grey, proximally ill-defined nebulous band 5 to 6 mm. in breadth, which encloses small yellowish marginal spots, beneath with a sharply defined black apical spot 3 mm. in breadth, which from vein 4 onwards passes into a very fine marginal line. Angola.
- astrigera Btlr. (60 f). Ground-colour above bright yellow-red with rosy reflection; both wings above deep black at the base; forewing with black apical spot about 4 mm. in breadth, which passes posteriorly into a fine marginal line; no marginal spots. The female with duller, more yellowish ground-colour. Rhodesia to British East Africa.
- female ab. emini Weym. is larger and has the forewing above not or little darkened at the base. German East Africa.
- f. brunnea Eltr. (60 f) only differs in the yellow-brown ground-colour of the upper surface; sexes similar. Angola; Rhodesia; German East Africa.

== Subspecies ==
- Acraea pseudolycia pseudolycia — Angola, western Zambia, Democratic Republic of the Congo: Lualaba, Maniema
- Acraea pseudolycia astrigera Butler, 1899 — central and eastern Kenya, Tanzania, eastern Zambia, Malawi, northern Uganda, Sudan, Ethiopia

== Taxonomy ==
Acraea pseudolycia is a member of the Acraea anemosa species group. The clade members are:

- Acraea anemosa
- Acraea pseudolycia
- Acraea turna

Classification of Acraea by Henning, Henning & Williams, Pierre. J. & Bernaud

- Acraea (group anemosa) Henning, 1993
- Acraea (Acraea) Henning & Williams, 2010
- Acraea (Acraea) (subgroup anemosa) Pierre & Bernaud, 2013
- Acraea (Acraea) Groupe zetes Pierre & Bernaud, 2014
