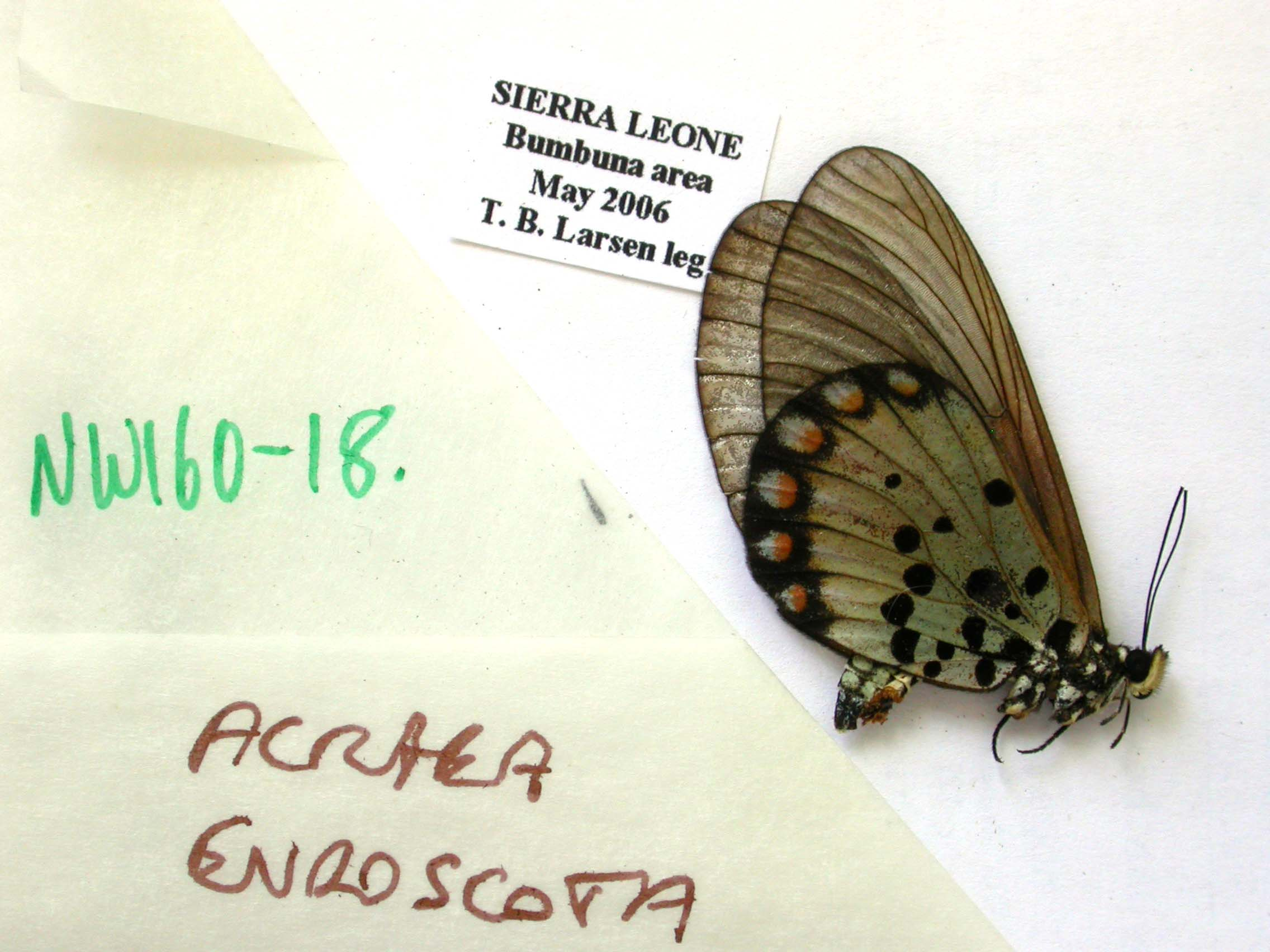

Scientific classification
- Kingdom: Animalia
- Phylum: Arthropoda
- Clade: Pancrustacea
- Class: Insecta
- Order: Lepidoptera
- Family: Nymphalidae
- Genus: Acraea
- Species: A. endoscota

Binomial name
- Acraea endoscota Le Doux, 1928

Synonyms
- Acraea (Acraea) endoscota; Acraea endoscota f. albanis Pierre, 1979

= Acraea endoscota =

Species of butterfly

Acraea endoscota, the Le Doux's glassy acraea, is a butterfly in the family Nymphalidae. It is found in Guinea, Sierra Leone, Ivory Coast, Ghana, Nigeria, Cameroon, Gabon, the Republic of the Congo, the Central African Republic, northern Angola, the Democratic Republic of the Congo (Mongala, Kivu, Kasai, Sankuru), Uganda, Rwanda, south-western Ethiopia, western Kenya and western Tanzania.

== Biology ==
The habitat consists of forests.

Adults are attracted to flowers.

The larvae feed on Rinorea breviracemosa.

Torben Larsen developed a species numbering system for his 2005 publication Butterflies of West Africa. This species is #1181. The 'Larsen' numbers have since been used with permission in A Sharp Eye on Butterflies of Ghana.

== Taxonomy ==
It is a member of the Acraea terpsicore species group - but see also Pierre & Bernaud, 2014
