= Acraea guluensis =

Scientific classification
- Kingdom: Animalia
- Phylum: Arthropoda
- Class: Insecta
- Order: Lepidoptera
- Family: Nymphalidae
- Genus: Acraea
- Species: A. guluensis

Binomial name
- Acraea guluensis Le Doux, 1932

Synonyms
- Acraea manca guluensis Le Doux, 1932; Acraea (Acraea) guluensis

Species of butterfly

Acraea guluensis is a species of butterfly in the family Nymphalidae. It is found in northern Uganda and southern Sudan.

== Taxonomy ==
Acraea guluensis is a member of the Acraea acrita species group. The clade members are:

- Acraea guluensis
- Acraea acrita
- Acraea chaeribula
- Acraea eltringhamiana
- Acraea lualabae
- Acraea manca
- Acraea pudorina
- Acraea utengulensis

Classification of Acraea by Henning, Henning & Williams, Pierre. J. & Bernaud

- Acraea (group acrita) Henning, 1993
- Acraea (Rubraea) Henning & Williams, 2010
- Acraea (Acraea) (supraspecies acrita) Pierre & Bernaud, 2013
- Acraea (Acraea) Groupe egina Pierre & Bernaud, 2014
