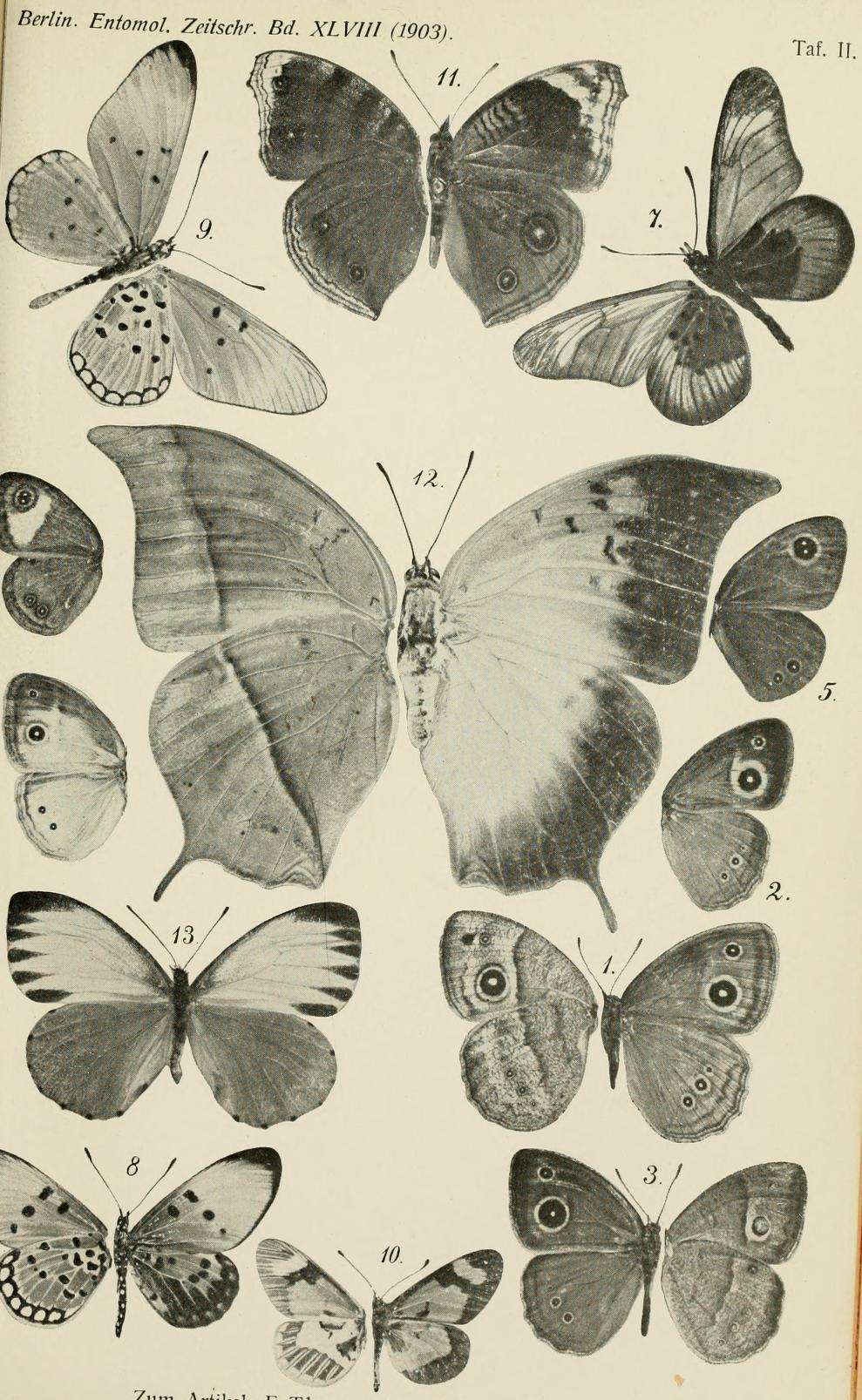
- Acraea acrita utengulensis figure 9

Scientific classification
- Kingdom: Animalia
- Phylum: Arthropoda
- Clade: Pancrustacea
- Class: Insecta
- Order: Lepidoptera
- Family: Nymphalidae
- Genus: Acraea
- Species: A. utengulensis

Binomial name
- Acraea utengulensis Thurau, 1903

Synonyms
- Acraea acrita var. utengulensis Thurau, 1903; Acraea (Acraea) utengulensis; Acraea (acrita) manca f. taborensis Le Doux, 1931

= Acraea utengulensis =

Tanzanian fiery acraea

Species of butterfly

Acraea utengulensis, the Tanzanian fiery acraea, is a butterfly in the family Nymphalidae. It is found in northern and central Tanzania and Zambia.

== Taxonomy ==
Acraea utengulensis is a member of the Acraea acrita species group. The clade members are:

- Acraea utengulensis
- Acraea acrita
- Acraea chaeribula
- Acraea eltringhamiana
- Acraea guluensis
- Acraea lualabae
- Acraea manca
- Acraea pudorina

Treated as a form of Acraea pudorina by Per Olof Christopher Aurivillius in Adalbert Seitz's Die Gross-Schmetterlinge der Erde (in English: The Macrolepidoptera of the World) (1907). See the Acraea acrita species complex.

Classification of Acraea by Henning, Henning & Williams, Pierre. J. & Bernaud

- Acraea (group acrita) Henning, 1993
- Acraea (Rubraea) Henning & Williams, 2010
- Acraea (Acraea) (subgroup acrita) Pierre & Bernaud, 2013
- Acraea (Acraea) Groupe egina Pierre & Bernaud, 2014
