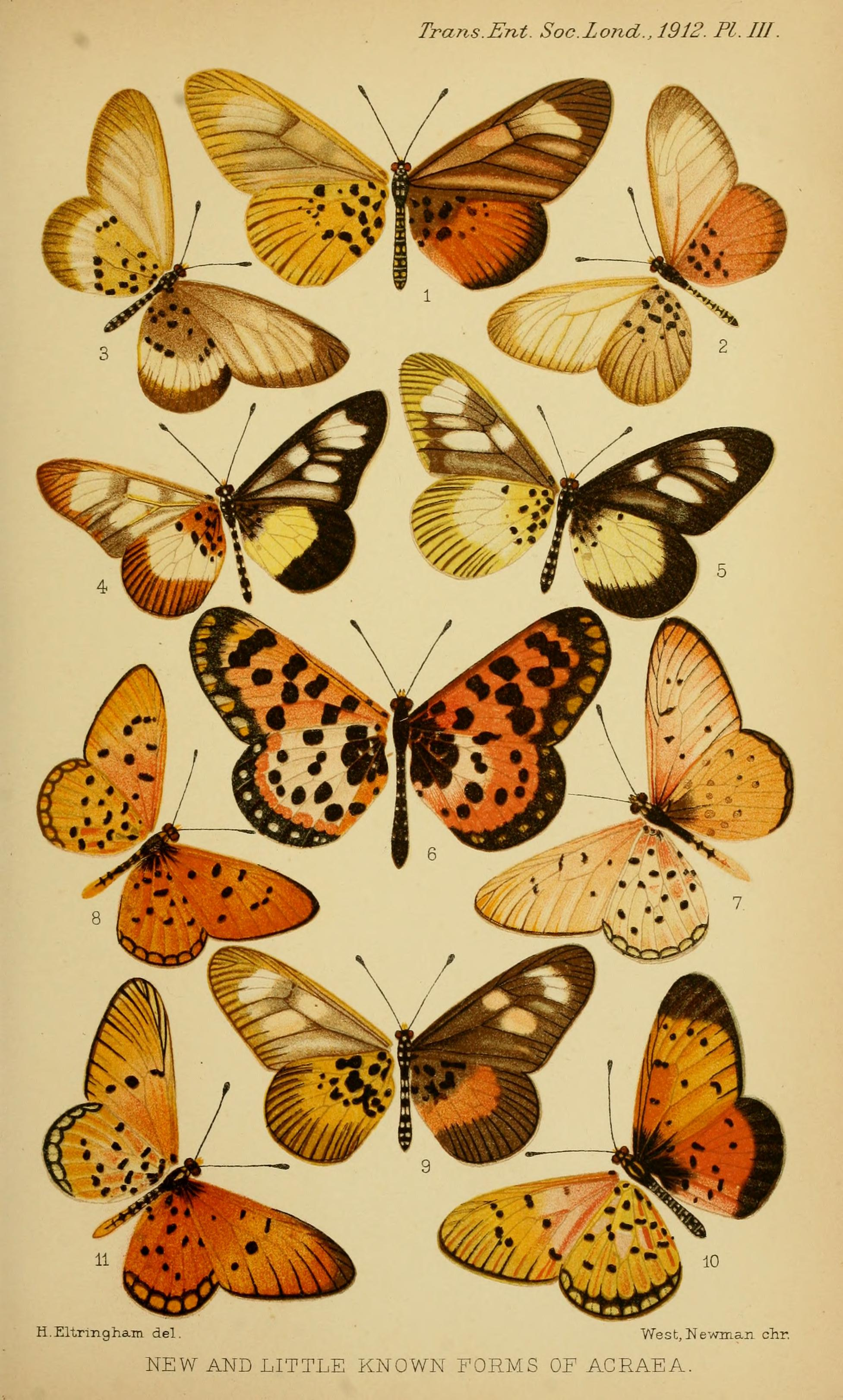
- Figure 8

Scientific classification
- Kingdom: Animalia
- Phylum: Arthropoda
- Class: Insecta
- Order: Lepidoptera
- Family: Nymphalidae
- Genus: Acraea
- Species: A. manca

Binomial name
- Acraea manca Thurau, 1904

Synonyms
- Acraea guillemei var. manca Thurau, 1904; Acraea (Acraea) manca

= Acraea manca =

Species of butterfly

Acraea manca is a butterfly in the family Nymphalidae. It is found in Tanzania.

== Description ==
Very similar to Acraea acrita qv.

== Taxonomy ==
Acraea manca is a member of the Acraea acrita species group. The clade members are:

- Acraea manca
- Acraea acrita
- Acraea chaeribula
- Acraea eltringhamiana
- Acraea guluensis
- Acraea lualabae
- Acraea pudorina
- Acraea utengulensis

Classification of Acraea by Henning, Henning & Williams, Pierre. J. & Bernaud

- Acraea (group acrita) Henning, 1993
- Acraea (Rubraea) Henning & Williams, 2010
- Acraea (Acraea) (subgroup acrita) Pierre & Bernaud, 2013
- Acraea (Acraea) Groupe egina Pierre & Bernaud, 2014
