= Acraea eltringhamiana =

Scientific classification
- Kingdom: Animalia
- Phylum: Arthropoda
- Class: Insecta
- Order: Lepidoptera
- Family: Nymphalidae
- Genus: Acraea
- Species: A. eltringhamiana

Binomial name
- Acraea eltringhamiana Le Doux, 1932

Synonyms
- Acraea acrita eltringhamiana Le Doux, 1932; Acraea (Acraea) eltringhamiana

Species of butterfly

Acraea eltringhamiana is a butterfly in the family Nymphalidae. It is found in Zambia (from the northern part of the country to Lake Bangweulu) and the south-eastern part of the Democratic Republic of the Congo.

Acraea eltringhamiana is a member of the Acraea acrita species group. The clade members are:

- Acraea eltringhamiana
- Acraea acrita
- Acraea chaeribula
- Acraea guluensis
- Acraea lualabae
- Acraea manca
- Acraea pudorina
- Acraea utengulensis
- Acraea (group horta) Henning, 1993
- Acraea (Acraea) Henning & Williams, 2010,
- Acraea (Acraea) (subgroup insignis) Pierre & Bernaud, 2013
- Acraea (Acraea) group egina Pierre & Bernaud, 2014
