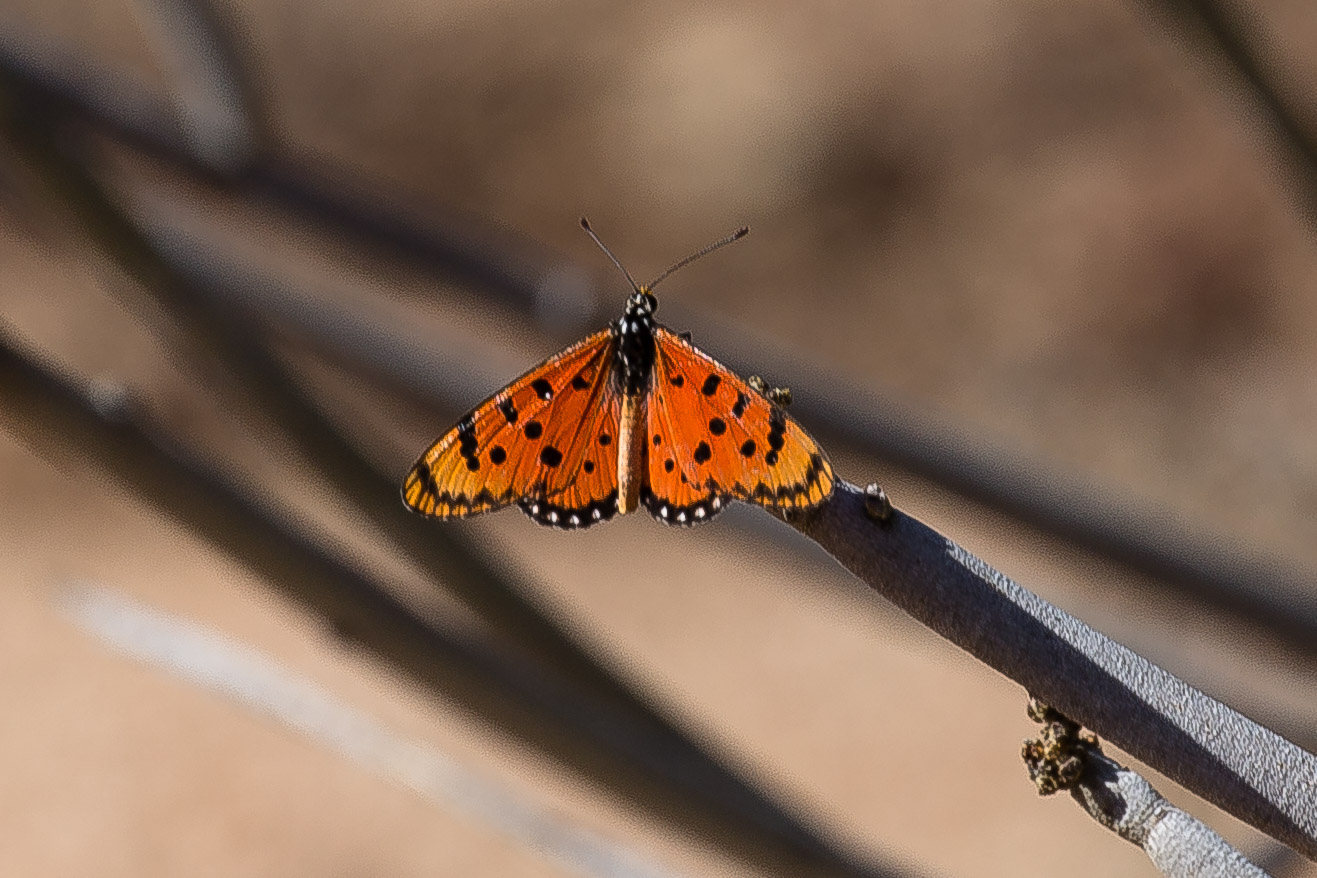

Scientific classification
- Kingdom: Animalia
- Phylum: Arthropoda
- Class: Insecta
- Order: Lepidoptera
- Family: Nymphalidae
- Genus: Acraea
- Species: A. hypoleuca

Binomial name
- Acraea hypoleuca Trimen, 1898

Synonyms
- Acraea (Acraea) hypoleuca

= Acraea hypoleuca =

Species of butterfly

Acraea hypoleuca, the Namibian acraea, is a butterfly in the family Nymphalidae. It is found in Namibia.

== Description ==
A. hypoleuca Trim. Expanse about 60 mm. Wings above orange-red; forewing above with dark marginal band, which encloses 8 large light marginal spots; discal dots in 1 b to 6, all rounded, that in 1 b near the distal margin, those in 2 to 4 in a line, those in 4 to 6 also in a line, placed almost vertically to the preceding; beneath as above, but with whitish subapical band. Hindwing above with white-spotted marginal band 2 mm. in breadth and distinct discal spots, beneath marked as above but with whitish ground colour and larger white marginal spots. Seems to be nearly allied to A. chilo and Acraea zetes. The only known specimen probably came from German South-West Africa.

== Biology ==
The habitat consists of gullies and granite outcrops.

Adults have been recorded feeding on the flowers of Psilocaulon species and Calicorema capitata. They are on wing from December to June.

The larvae feed on Adenia pechuelli.

== Taxonomy ==
It is a member of the Acraea zetes species group - but see also Pierre & Bernaud, 2014
