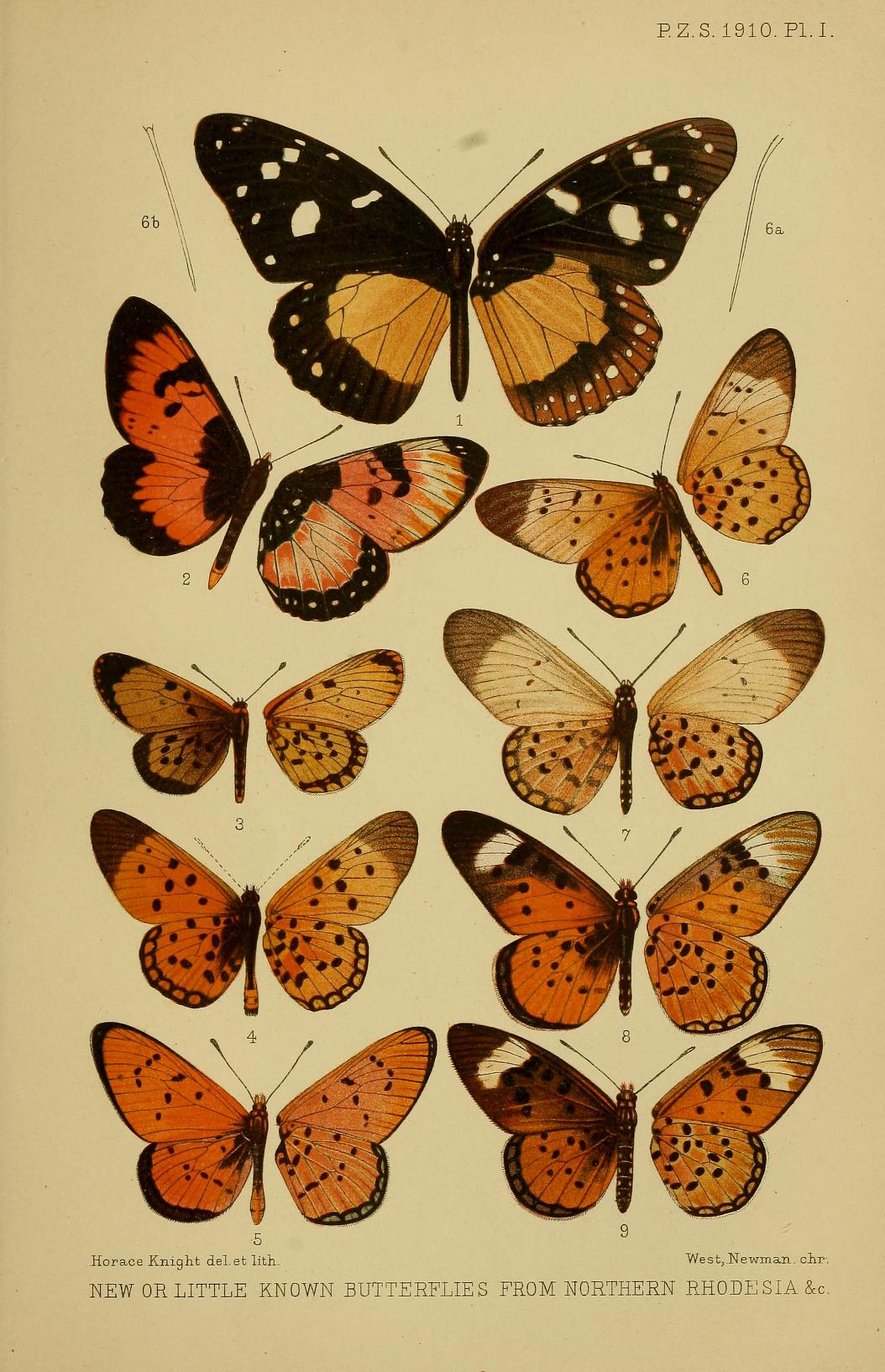
- Male figure 4

Scientific classification
- Kingdom: Animalia
- Phylum: Arthropoda
- Class: Insecta
- Order: Lepidoptera
- Family: Nymphalidae
- Genus: Acraea
- Species: A. lualabae

Binomial name
- Acraea lualabae Neave, 1910

Synonyms
- Acraea (Acraea) lualabae; Acraea lualabae f. kanonga Overlaet, 1955

= Acraea lualabae =

Species of butterfly

Acraea lualabae is a butterfly in the family Nymphalidae. It is found in the Democratic Republic of the Congo (Shaba).

== Description ==
In 1912, Harry Eltringham wrote:

Male. Expanse about 50 mm. Wings rather dull orange somewhat paler on forewing median area: forewing. with a very slight black suffusion at base and a conspicuous black tip about 7 mm. wide. A black spot in cell very slightly beyond origin of 2, and one on upper part of end of cell. Two discal spots beyond cell, one in 5 and a larger one in 3. In 2 a large spot touching the median, and in lb a submarginal and a subbasal spot. Hindwing dull orange with a black basal suffusion, and a marginal border formed of black arches on a narrow marginal line. Spots as on underside but smaller. In the cotype at Oxford there is a spot in area 5 on upperside, which is reduced to a minute dot on underside. The type has no spot in this area. Underside. Forewing as on upperside but paler, the apical black replaced by dark ochreous. A black spot at base of costa. Hindwing. Pale orange ochreous, lemon ochreous at base of cell to inner margin, reddish at base of area 7, and in median portion of 1c, 1b and 1a. Marginal border with black arches enclosing rounded spots of pale dull ochreous. Black spots as follows: A median spot in 7, a spot in 6 much nearer margin, under this a minute dot in 5 representing the spot on upperside which is present in the cotype and not in the type; in 4 a spot near margin immediately beneath that in 6, a spot in 3 not quite touching end of cell, one in 2 touching median and nervule 2, a large transverse spot in 1c, nearer to margin, and one in lb and 1a nearer to base. In addition to these, a spot in 8 slightly removed from precostal, a subbasal in 7, two in cell, one at base of 5 touching m.d.c, a transverse subbasal spot in 1c and la, and between these, but more distally placed, a small spot in lb.

Head and thorax black, latter with a few brown hairs, abdomen black with the last two or three segments orange. Claws unequal. The genital armature is very distinct. The claspers are entirely different from those of acrita, or indeed of any other species I have examined. The true uncus is reduced to a mere bristle, whilst the chitinous sheath of the penis is developed into what appears to be a false uncus.

Female unknown.

== Description in Seitz ==
A. lualabae Neave is very similar to the two following species [A. chaeribula, A. acrita ], scarcely differing except in the forewing having two to four discal dots in cellules 3 to 6. Both wings above orange-yellow with large black dots; apical spot of the forewing about 8 mm. in breadth, indicated beneath also; marginal band of the hindwing on both surfaces with large light spots; hindwing above blackish at the base. Congo: Lualaba.

== Taxonomy ==
Acraea lualabae is a member of the Acraea acrita species group. The clade members are:

- Acraea lualabae
- Acraea acrita
- Acraea chaeribula
- Acraea eltringhamiana
- Acraea guluensis
- Acraea manca
- Acraea pudorina
- Acraea utengulensis

Classification of Acraea by Henning, Henning & Williams, Pierre. J. & Bernaud

- Acraea (group acrita) Henning, 1993
- Acraea (Rubraea) Henning & Williams, 2010
- Acraea (Acraea) (subgroup acrita) Pierre & Bernaud, 2013
- Acraea (Acraea) Groupe egina Pierre & Bernaud, 2014

== Etymology ==
Lualaba is in the Congo.
