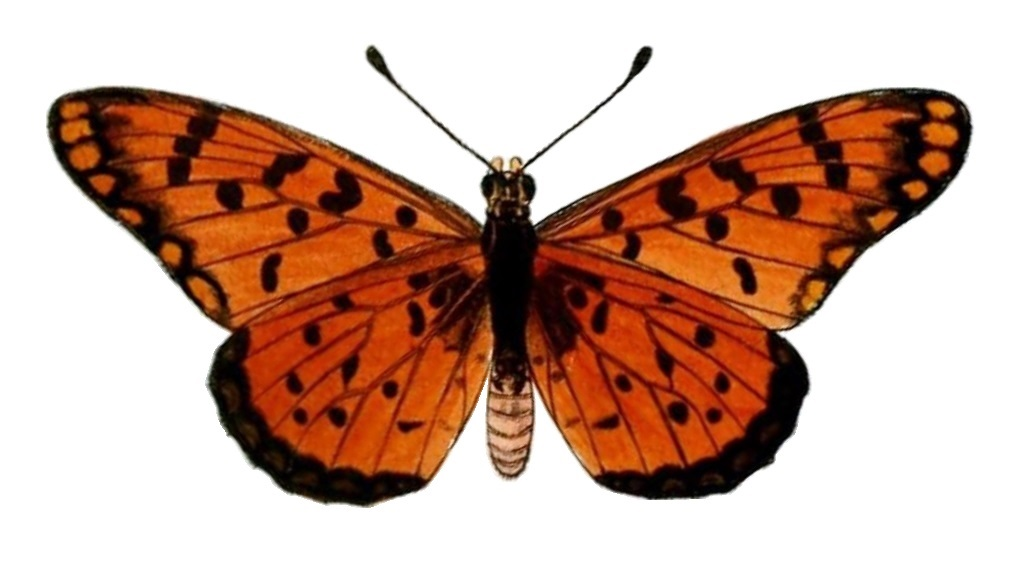

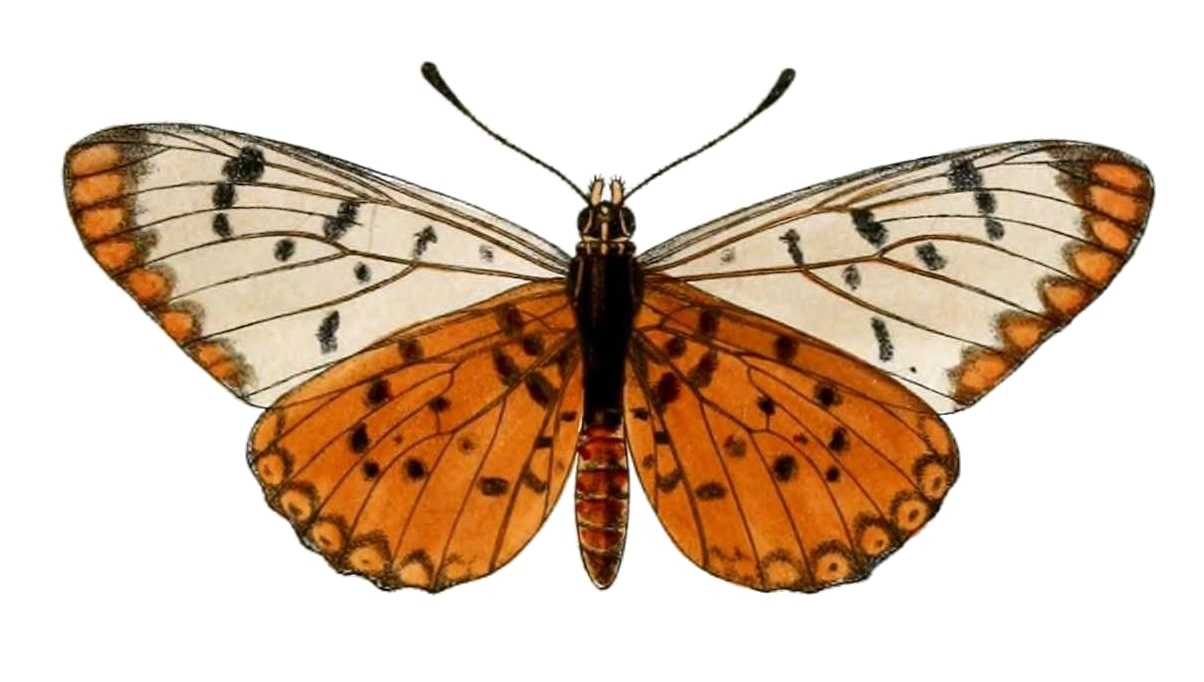
- male and female

Scientific classification
- Kingdom: Animalia
- Phylum: Arthropoda
- Class: Insecta
- Order: Lepidoptera
- Family: Nymphalidae
- Genus: Acraea
- Species: A. chilo

Binomial name
- Acraea chilo Godman, 1880

Synonyms
- Acraea (Acraea) chilo; Acraea crystallina Grose-Smith, 1890; Acraea rosina Rogenhofer, 1891; Telchinia rosina; Acraea hoehneli Holland, 1896; Acraea wissmanni Weymer, 1903

= Acraea chilo =

Species of butterfly

Acraea chilo is a butterfly in the family Nymphalidae. It is found in Sudan, Ethiopia, Kenya, Tanzania, Somalia, Saudi Arabia and Yemen.

== Description ==
A. chilo Godm. (55 a; and 54 c, as barberi). The basal dot in 1 c and the discal dots in 2 to 4 of the forewing all four stand in a line running almost parallel with the costal margin. In this chilo and the following species [related] differ from all the rest of the subgroup. Such an arrangement of these dots is also very rare among the other African Acraeids, only occurring in niobe, hypoleuca, anacreon, mirifica and approximately also in wigginsi and neobule. male: forewing above light yellowish red, somewhat rose-coloured, at the base not or little darkened; forewing with the marginal band spotted with orange-yellow, 3 to 6 mm. broad, of uniform breadth or widened at the apex, a basal dot in 1 b, 2 in the cell, a median spot and large discal dots in 1 b to 6, of which the dot in lb is placed much nearer to the distal margin than the one in 2; hindwing above with indistinctly spotted marginal band 3 mm. in breadth and distinct discal dots, the one in 4 placed nearer to the distal margin than the rest and the one in 2 near the base of the cellule. Forewing beneath almost as above, but with whitish subapical band between discal dots 4 to 6 and the marginal band; hindwing beneath whitish yellow with some red spots in 1 a to 1 c and at the base of the costal margin and with large whitish marginal spots. In the female the forewing is hyaline with smaller black dots and larger orange-yellow marginal spots; hindwing as in the male, but more thinly scaled and lighter-coloured and also above with large, often black-dotted, yellow spots in the marginal band. Kilimandjaro; British East Africa; Somaliland and Abyssinia. -ab. crystallina Smith (54 a) is an extreme form of the female in which both wings are hyaline, only at the base slightly yellowish, and the fore wing lacks all the black dots and also the marginal band. On account of the lack of markings this clue to the identification of this form with chilo fails, and the proof must depend on a comparison of several intermediate forms. Eltringham regards crystallina as the typical female of chilo, but as Godman described and figured, at the same time as the male another female much more nearly agreeing with it, this latter form must be regarded as typical. Kilimandjaro and British East Africa.

== Subspecies ==
- Acraea chilo chilo — Sudan, southern Ethiopia, eastern and central Kenya, north-eastern Tanzania, Somalia
- Acraea chilo yemensis Le Doux, 1931 — south-western Saudi Arabia, Yemen

== Taxonomy ==
It is a member of the Acraea zetes species group- but see also Pierre & Bernaud, 2014
