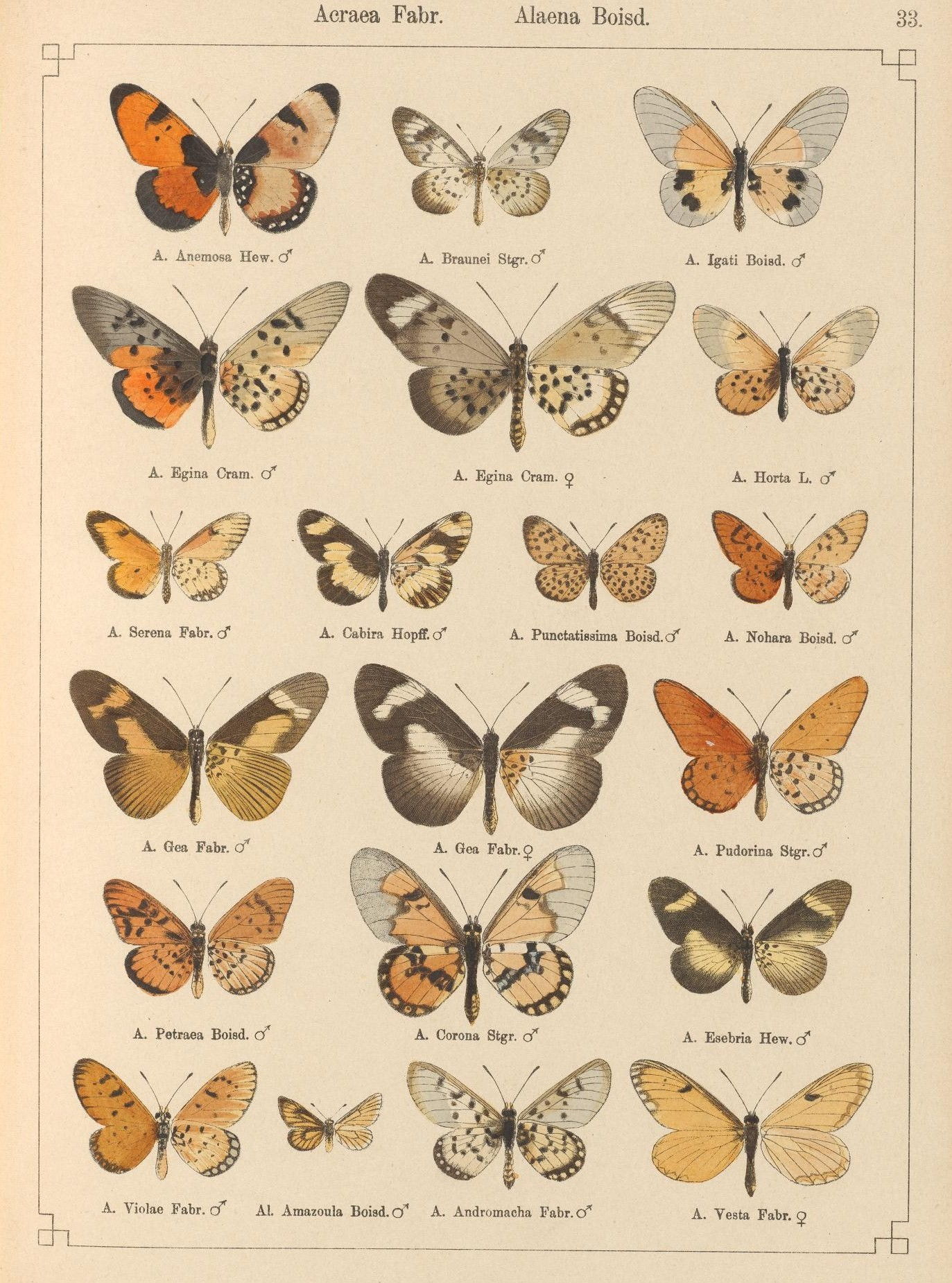

Scientific classification
- Kingdom: Animalia
- Phylum: Arthropoda
- Class: Insecta
- Order: Lepidoptera
- Family: Nymphalidae
- Genus: Acraea
- Species: A. pudorina

Binomial name
- Acraea pudorina Staudinger, 1885

Synonyms
- Acraea (Acraea) pudorina; Acraea acrita var. emboensis Gaede, 1915; Acraea acrita pudorina f. rubida Le Doux, 1923; Acraea acrita pudorina f. mancamorpha Le Doux, 1932

= Acraea pudorina =

Kenyan fiery acraea

Species of butterfly

Acraea pudorina, the Kenyan fiery acraea, is a butterfly in the family Nymphalidae. It is found in central and southern Kenya and Tanzania.

== Description ==
Very similar to Acraea acrita qv.

== Taxonomy ==
Acraea pudorina is a member of the Acraea acrita species group. The other clade members are:

- Acraea acrita
- Acraea chaeribula
- Acraea eltringhamiana
- Acraea guluensis
- Acraea lualabae
- Acraea manca
- Acraea utengulensis

Classification of Acraea by Henning, Henning & Williams, Pierre. J. & Bernaud

- Acraea (group acrita) Henning, 1993
- Acraea (Rubraea) Henning & Williams, 2010
- Acraea (Acraea) (supraspecies acrita)
- Acraea (Acraea) Groupe egina Pierre & Bernaud, 2014
