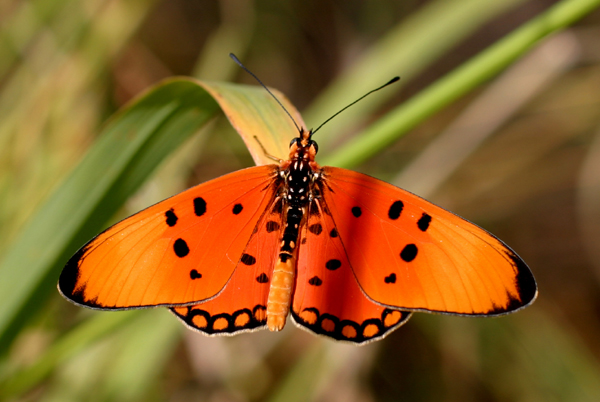

Conservation status
- Least Concern (IUCN 3.1)

Scientific classification
- Kingdom: Animalia
- Phylum: Arthropoda
- Clade: Pancrustacea
- Class: Insecta
- Order: Lepidoptera
- Family: Nymphalidae
- Genus: Acraea
- Species: A. acrita

Binomial name
- Acraea acrita Hewitson, 1865

Synonyms
- Acraea (Acraea) acrita; Acraea acrita ab. pauperata Thurau, 1903; Acraea acrita ab. aquilia Thurau, 1903; Acraea acrita f. chaeribulula Strand, 1911; Acraea acrita ab. aquilina Strand, 1911; Acraea acrita f. msamwiae Strand, 1911; Acraea acrita f. lindica Strand, 1911; Acraea acrita ab. usaramensis Strand, 1911; Acraea acrita f. nyassicola Strand, 1911; Acraea acrita littoralis Eltringham, 1912; Acraea acrita f. megaspila Le Cerf, 1927; Acraea acrita acrita f. albomaculosa Le Doux, 1931; Acraea acrita acrita f. fusca Le Doux, 1932; Acraea acrita acrita f. nigromarginata Le Doux, 1932; Acraea ambigua Trimen, 1891; Acraea acrita var. bella Weymer, 1901

= Acraea acrita =

Fiery acraea

Species of butterfly

Acraea acrita, the fiery acraea, is a butterfly of the family Nymphalidae. It is found in large parts of Africa.

== Description ==
A. acrita and related species

The wingspan is 45–55 mm. A. acrita is very variable, but may always be known by the veins not being black and by discal dots 3 to 6 of the forewing being usually absent and the apical spot of the forewing if present lighter and smaller than in Acraea chaeribula. According to Eltringham the species has 6 races or subspecies (the type-form, ambigua, pudorina [ now species Acraea pudorina ], littoralis, manca [now species Acraea manca ] and bellona) and in addition numerous aberrations and seasonal forms. The ground-colour of the upper surface bright fiery orange-red; discal dots 1 b and 2, as well as the median dots of the forewing, placed in a line almost vertical to the costal margin. - acrita Hew. (55 b). Forewing beyond the cell orange-yellow, at the apex at most with black marginal band 2 mm. in breadth; hindwing above with regular, sharply defined, light-spotted marginal band about 2 mm. in breadth and beneath with large red spots or stripes both proximally and distally to the discal dots; the forewing above not or very little darkened at the base. The rainy-season form differs in having the apical spot of the fore wing 3 to 4 mm. in breadth with its proximal edge straight, while the forewing above is often darkened at the base as far as the basal dot in 1 b and the marginal band on the upperside of the hindwing is about 3 mm. in breadth and proximally more or less widened, particularly in cellule 3. In the female the fore wing above is brown-yellow to coffee-brown to the apex of the cell and has the apical spot on an average broader; the females of the rainy- season form have a blackish ground-colour and are only in the subapical part of the fore wing smoky yellow' or whitish. Mashonaland, Manicaland, Rhodesia and Nyassaland. - ab. msamviae Strand is based on males of the extreme rainy-season form, in which the marginal band of the hindwing above is 4 mm. in breadth and at the inner margin widened over the whole wing as far as the base. On the southern shores of Lake Tanganyika. - female ab. aquilina Strand has the whole hindwing and the basal half of the fore wing coffee-brown; marginal band of the hindwing sharply defined proximally and the basal area of the hindwing not blackened; discal dots of the hindwing beneath separated by at least their diameter and forming a strongly curved row. German East Africa - ab. nyassicola Strand is according to Eltringham a male form intermediate between those of the dry and rainy seasons and has the apical spot of the forewing 2 to 3 mm. in breadth and large marginal spots on the upperside of the hindwing, only bounded by fine lunules. Nyassaland. - ambigua Trim, is distinguished by having the apical spot of the fore wing larger, about 6 mm. in breadth, the marginal band of the hindwing above only composed of fine or indistinct lunules, showing through from beneath, and particularly by the hind wing beneath being almost unicolorous between the discal dots and the marginal band, without distinct red spots. The subapical area on the upperside of the fore wing is usually lighter than in the type- form and occasionally in the female white. Danaraland to Tanganyika. - bella Weym. agrees with ambigua in the large apical spot of the forewing, which is 7 to 8 mm. in breadth, in the formation of the marginal band on the hindwing above and the colouring of the hind wing beneath, but differs from it and from all the other races in the very large black spots of the forewing; in the rainy-season form, bellona Weym. [now species Acraea bellona ](59f), these some times become so large as to touch one another; the basal dot in cellule 1 b of the forewing is absent in the dry-season form, but large in that of the rainy season. Forewing in the female of the rainy-season form with white subapical area. Angola. -littoralis Eltr. is the race usually occurring in German East Africa and nearly approaches the type-form; it only differs in the somewhat broader apical spot of the forewing, which in the dry-season form is 3 mm. and in the rainy-season form, usaramensis Strand, 4 to 5 mm. in breadth. - female ab. aquilia Thur. is a rainy-season form in which the hindwing and the basal half of the forewing are coffee-brown; the black marginal band on the upperside of the hindwing is at least 4 mm. in breadth and is very irregularly defined proximally. - female ab. chaeribulula Strand has the apical spot on the forewing above 7 mm. in breadth and the hindwing blackened at the base and is regarded by Eltringham as an intermediate form between the dry- and rainy-season forms. East Africa. -pudorina Stgr. [Acraea pudorina (55 b) may be known by the longer and more pointed forewing, which at the apex is scarcely black or at most for a breadth of 2 mm. (= utengulensis Thur., the rainy-season form); the ground-colour of the upper surface is duller than in the type-form and the black dots of the fore wing are small or absent; marginal band on the upperside of the hindwing with large marginal spots, the under surface not or scarcely spotted with red between the marginal band and the discal dots. Kilimandjaro and British East Africa. - manca Thur. [ Acraea manca] is similar to pudorina, but has the forewing shorter and somewhat broader and differs from all the other forms in the forewing having well developed discal dots in cellules 3 to 6; marginal spots on the upperside of the hindwing large but bounded by sharply prominent lunules; hindwing beneath without large red spots in cellules 2 to 6. German East Africa - f. lindica Strand is unknown to me, but according to Eltringham is a form of manca. It differs considerably, however, in that the fore wing has the apical spot 5 to 6 mm. in breadth and lacks the discal dots in 3 to 6. German East Africa. - Thurau has expressly designated as pauperata all such specimens of acrita as lack the basal dot in cellule 1 b of the fore wing; they occur among all the races of acrita and are not rare.

== Subspecies ==
- Acraea acrita acrita (Uganda, southern Kenya, Tanzania, Democratic Republic of the Congo, Malawi, Mozambique, Zimbabwe, South Africa)
- Acraea acrita ambigua Trimen, 1891(Zambia, southern Angola, Botswana, northern Namibia)

== Biology ==
Adults are on wing year round, with a peak from February to June in southern Africa. The larvae feed on Passifloraceae, including Adenia species.

== Taxonomy ==
See Species complex. Acraea acrita is the nominate member of the Acraea acrita species group. The clade members are:

- Acraea acrita
- Acraea chaeribula
- Acraea eltringhamiana
- Acraea guluensis
- Acraea lualabae
- Acraea manca
- Acraea pudorina
- Acraea utengulensis

Classification of Acraea by Henning, Henning & Williams, Pierre. J. & Bernaud

- Acraea (group acrita); Henning, 1993
- Acraea (Rubraea) Henning & Williams 2010
- Acraea (Acraea) (supraspecies acrita) Pierre, J. & Bernaud, D., 2013
- Acraea (Acraea) groupe egina Pierre. J. & Bernaud, D. 2014
