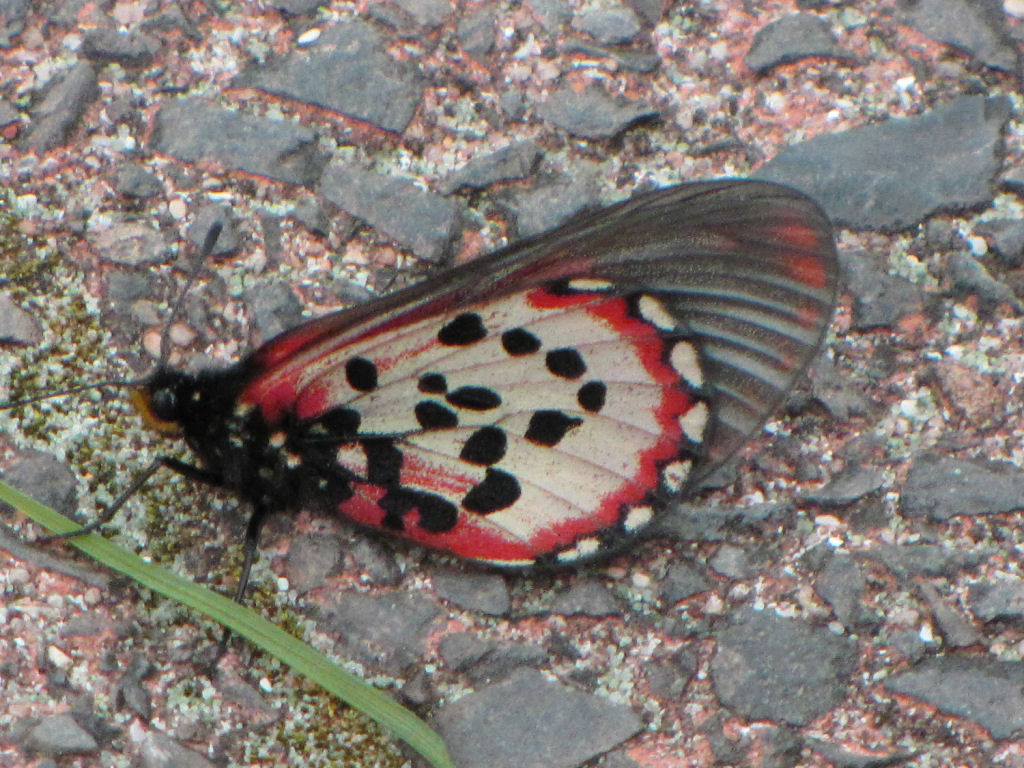
- Male
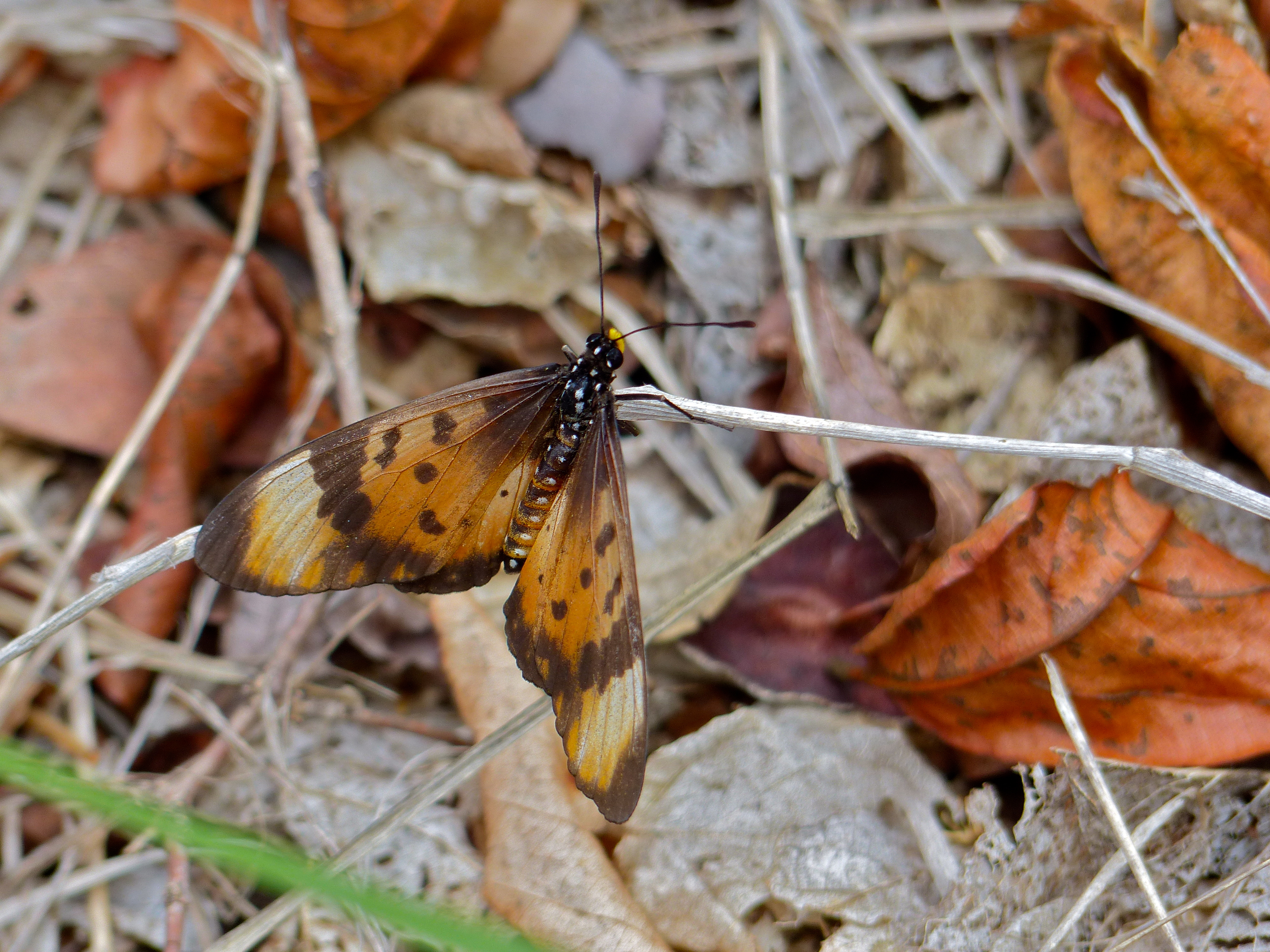
- Female

Scientific classification
- Kingdom: Animalia
- Phylum: Arthropoda
- Class: Insecta
- Order: Lepidoptera
- Family: Nymphalidae
- Genus: Acraea
- Species: A. acara

Binomial name
- Acraea acara Hewitson, [1865]

Synonyms
- Acraea zetes tescea Suffert, 1904; Acraea zetes mhondana Suffert, 1904; Acraea caffra Felder & Felder, 1865; Acraea zetes ukerewensis Le Doux, 1923; Acraea zetes sufferti Le Cerf, 1927; Acraea zetes acara f. barberina van Son, 1963; Acraea zetes sufferti f. melanophanes Le Cerf, 1927

= Acraea acara =

Acara acraea

Species of butterfly

Acraea acara, commonly known as the acara acraea, is a butterfly of the family Nymphalidae which is native to East and southern Africa.

== Description ==
See Acraea zetes for diagnosis The wingspan is 55–66 mm for males and 60–72 mm for females.

== Range and habitat ==
It is found in South Africa, Mozambique, Zimbabwe, Zambia, Katanga in the southern DRC, Malawi, Tanzania, and eastern Kenya. In South Africa its range has expanded southwards since 2014, becoming more widespread in the Eastern Cape. The habitat consists of forests and woodland.

== Subspecies ==
There are two subspecies:

- Acraea acara acara – eastern Kenya, Tanzania, DRC: Shaba, Malawi, Zambia, Mozambique, Zimbabwe, Botswana, Namibia, Eswatini, South Africa: Limpopo, Mpumalanga, North West, KwaZulu-Natal, Eastern Cape
- Acraea acara melanophanes Le Cerf, 1927 – northern Namibia

== Taxonomy ==
It is a member of the Acraea zetes species group- but see also Pierre & Bernaud, 2014
