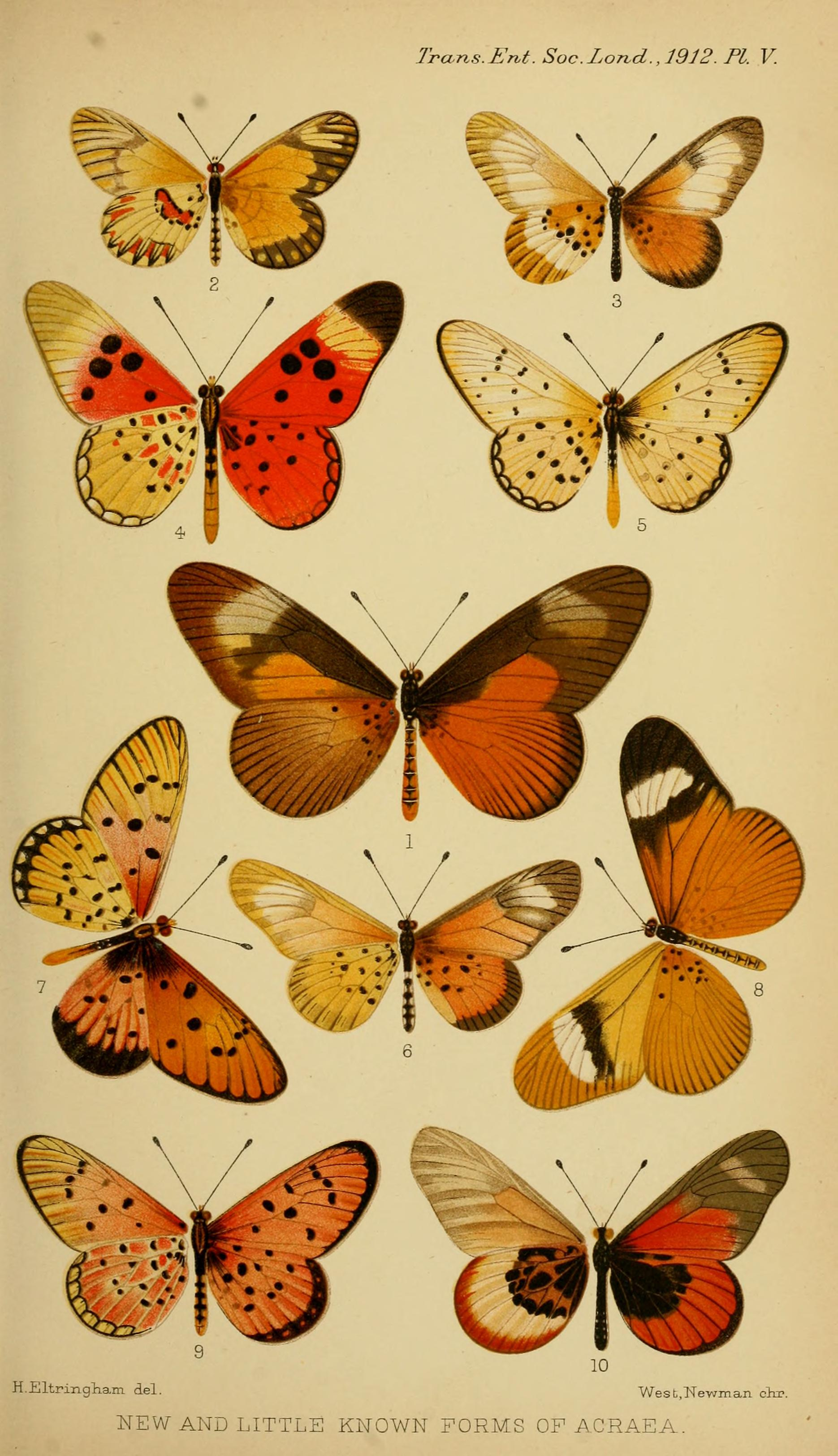
- Figure 4

Scientific classification
- Domain: Eukaryota
- Kingdom: Animalia
- Phylum: Arthropoda
- Class: Insecta
- Order: Lepidoptera
- Family: Nymphalidae
- Genus: Acraea
- Species: A. bellona

Binomial name
- Acraea bellona Weymer, 1908

Synonyms
- Acraea (Acraea) bellona; Acraea acrita bellona Weymer, 1908

= Acraea bellona =

Species of butterfly

Acraea bellona is a butterfly in the family Nymphalidae. It is found in Angola.

== Description ==
Close to Acraea acrita qv.

== Taxonomy ==
It is a member of the Acraea acrita species group.

- Acraea (group acrita) Henning, 1993, Metamorphosis 4 (1): 12
- Acraea (Acraea) (supraspecies acrita) Pierre & Bernaud, 2013, Butterflies of the World 39: 2, pl. 4, f. 11-12
- Acraea (Rubraea) Henning & Williams, 2010, Metamorphosis 21 (1): 10
