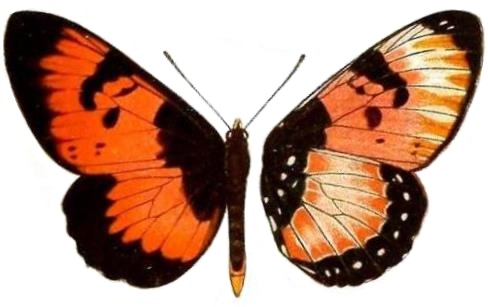
- Male imago, f. lobemba

Conservation status
- Least Concern (IUCN 3.1)

Scientific classification
- Kingdom: Animalia
- Phylum: Arthropoda
- Class: Insecta
- Order: Lepidoptera
- Family: Nymphalidae
- Genus: Acraea
- Species: A. anemosa

Binomial name
- Acraea anemosa Hewitson, 1865

Synonyms
- Acraea arcticincta Butler, 1883; Acraea anemosa mosana Suffert, 1904; Acraea anemosa dubiosa Suffert, 1904; Acraea welwitschii Rogenhofer, 1893; Acraea anemosa ab. alboradiata Aurivillius, 1899; Acraea anemosa ab. interrupta Thurau, 1904; Acraea anemosa ab. discoguttata Strand, 1909; Acraea anemosa ab. ufipana Strand, 1911; Acraea anemosa ab. urungensis Strand, 1911; Acraea welwitschii lobemba Eltringham, 1912; Acraea welwitschii lutea Riley, 1921; Acraea welwitschii nivea Riley, 1921; Acraea anemosa f. conjuncta Niepelt, 1937; Acraea anemosa macrosticta Storace, 1949

= Acraea anemosa =

Broad-bordered acraea

Species of butterfly

Acraea anemosa, the broad-bordered acraea, is a butterfly of the family Nymphalidae which is native to southern Africa and coastal East Africa.

== Range ==
It is found in Zululand, Eswatini, Transvaal, Zimbabwe, Mozambique, Malawi, Zambia, southern Zaire (Shaba), Namibia, Angola, Tanzania, the coast of eastern Kenya and southern Somalia.

== Description ==
It is a variable species with a number of described colour morphs including f. anemosa, f. arctitincta, f. mosana, f. welwitschii, f. nivea, f. alboradiata and f. lobemba. The wingspan is 50–55 mm for males and 57–64 mm for females.

A. anemosa Hew. Forewing above ochre-yellow to orange-yellow, at the base deep black to vein 2, the black colour sharply defined, at the distal margin with sharply defined black apical spot about 4 mm. in breadth and fine marginal line; a small median dot; discal dots 4 to 6 large and connected, 1b to 3 usually small or absent, the dot in 1b placed somewhat nearer to the distal margin than that in 2; hindwing above at the base and at the distal margin broadly black, and with a reddish yellow, unspotted median band. Forewing beneath coloured and marked as above; hindwing at the base and in the marginal band dotted with white; median band reddish white, proximally and distally with large red spots, which meet at the inner margin. Damaraland, Transvaal, Rhodesia; Portuguese, German and British East Africa.

- arcticincta Btlr. (54 c). Marginal band of the hindwing narrower, 4 to 6 mm. in breadth. Among the type-form.
- ab. interrupta Thur. The red-yellow ground-colour of the forewing encroaches as a narrow wedge-shaped spot into the black basal area of the cell, so as to form an elongate, quadrate black spot 2 mm. in breadth. Uganda.
- ab. mosana Suff. Forewing without median spot and without discal dots in 1b, 2 and 3.
- ab. dubiosa Suff. Hindwing above (not beneath) with small discal dots. German and British East Africa.
- ab. ufipana Strand only differs in having the median spot and discal dots 1b and 2 of the forewing large and strongly developed. German East Africa and Rhodesia.
- In ab. discoguttata Strand the forewing has "2 or 3 small dark round spots behind the costal spot in cellules 2 and 3". ab. urungensis Strand. Both wings above with but little black at the base; marginal band of the hindwing beneath with white spots, which are surrounded by the red post discal spots. German East Africa.

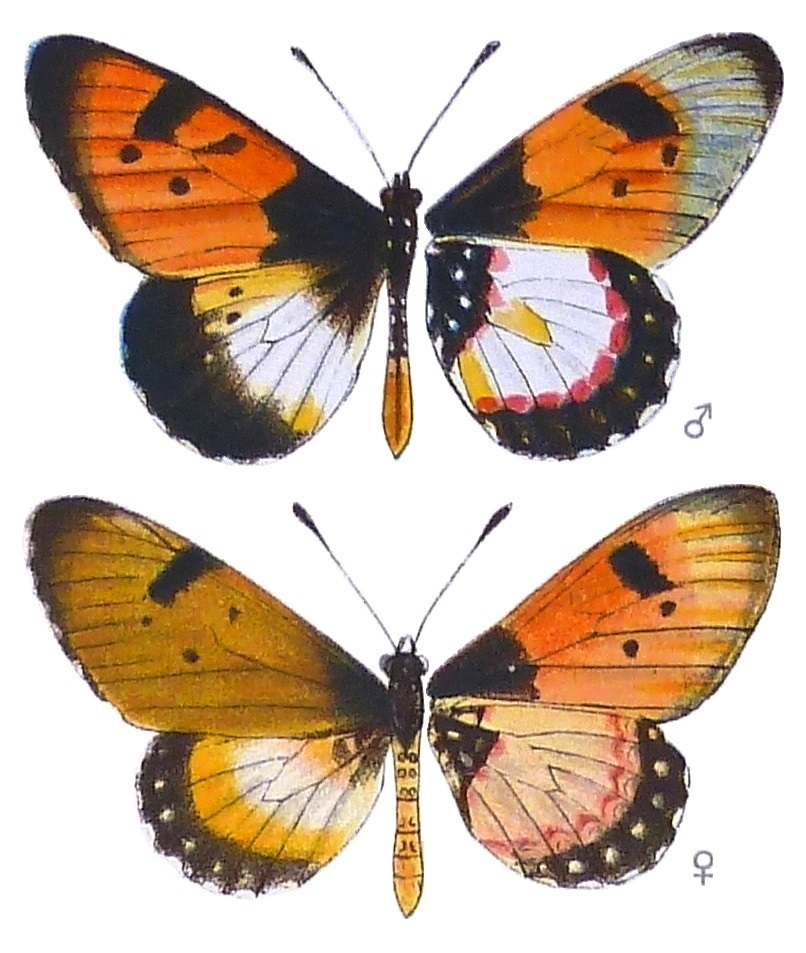
Male and female of A. anemosa f. welwitschii, illustrated in Seitz (1925)

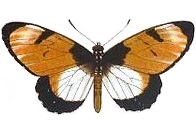
A. anemosa f. alboradiata, illustrated in Seitz (1925)

A. welwitschi so nearly approaches anemosa that it seems to me [Aurivillius] to be scarcely an independent species. The sole difference consists in the forewing having a dark marginal band extending from the apex to the hinder angle and becoming gradually narrower posteriorly. In some forms this band is so narrow behind vein 4 that it is little broader than the marginal line in anemosa. Such forms can only be distinguished from by having the hindwing above white in the middle.

- welwitschi Rogenh. (54 d; 60 g). male. Forewing orange-red, above more or less black at the base and with black marginal band, often dentate proximally, at vein 2 still about 2 mm. in breadth; hindwing with white median band and very broad black marginal band, ill-defined proximally. In the female the forewing has a dull ochre-yellow ground-colour and a narrower marginal band; median band of the hindwing yellowish, only in the middle whitish, and above much broader than in the male. Angola.
- alboradiata Auriv. (54 c). Forewing above light orange-yellow, before the apex with whitish rays; marginal band very narrow, especially posteriorly; hindwing above but little darkened at the base, in the middle for the most part white. Zambezi: at the Victoria Falls.
- lobemba Eltr. (54 c; as welwitschi). Both wings above with bright cherry-red ground-colour and at the base broadly black; forewing above at the costal margin black as far as the cell and with broad black marginal band; discal dots 3 to 6 united into a broad black transverse band, confluent with the costal border; median spot and discal dot 2 large. The female with brown-yellow ground-colour. North Rhodesia and southern Congo.

== Biology ==
Adults are on wing year round in warmer areas with a peak from September to May in southern Africa. In cooler areas, adults can only be found from September to May.

The larvae feed on Adenia venenata.

== Taxonomy ==
Acraea anemosa is a member of the Acraea anemosa species group. The clade members are:

- Acraea anemosa
- Acraea pseudolycia
- Acraea turna

Classification of Acraea by Henning, Henning & Williams, Pierre. J. & Bernaud

- Acraea (group anemosa) Henning, 1993
- Acraea (Acraea) Henning & Williams, 2010
- Acraea (Acraea) (subgroup anemosa) Pierre & Bernaud, 2013
- Acraea (Acraea) Groupe zetes Pierre & Bernaud, 2014
