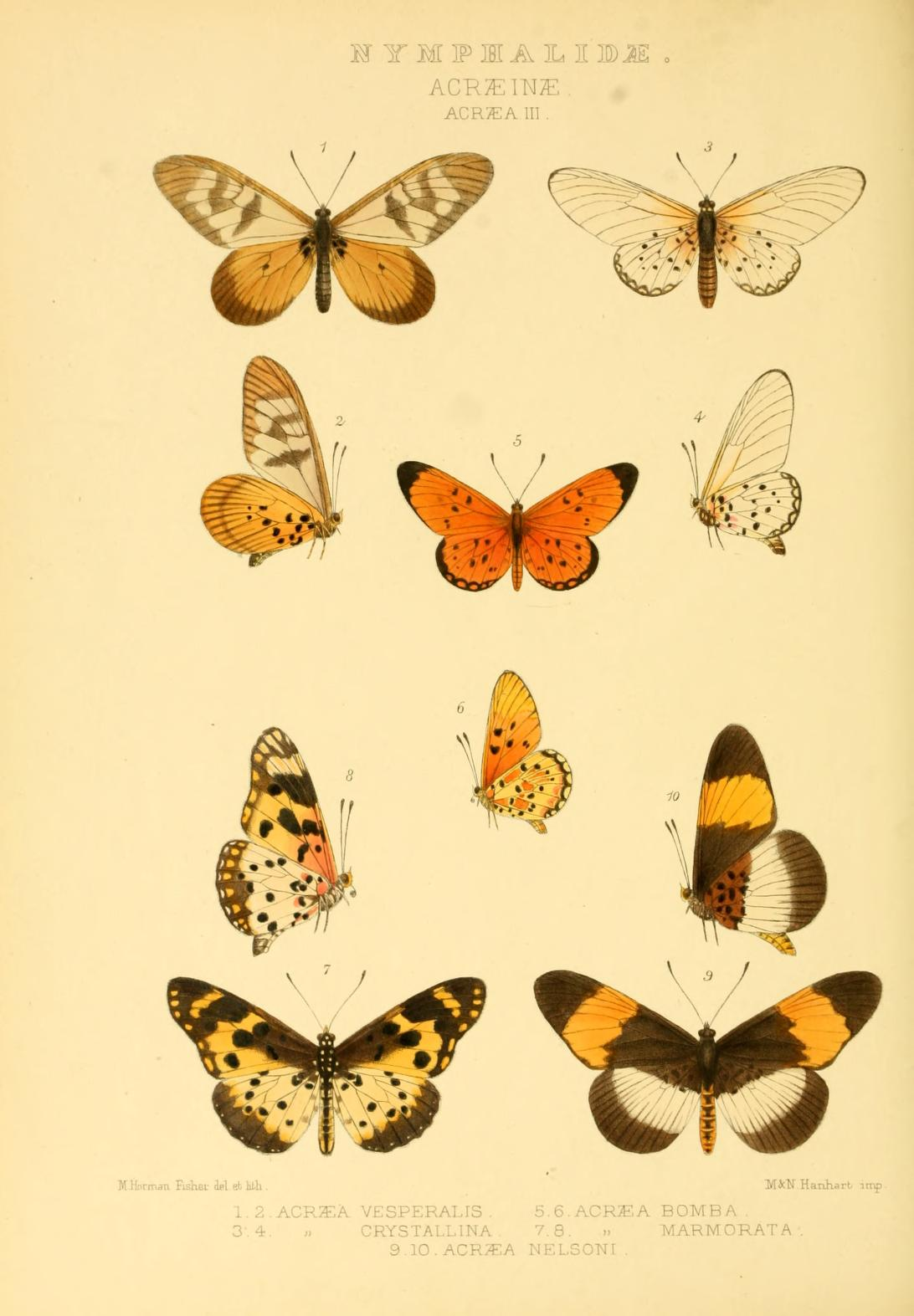
- Figures 7 and 8 as Acraea marmorata

Scientific classification
- Kingdom: Animalia
- Phylum: Arthropoda
- Class: Insecta
- Order: Lepidoptera
- Family: Nymphalidae
- Genus: Acraea
- Species: A. turna

Binomial name
- Acraea turna Mabille, 1877

Synonyms
- Acraea (Acraea) turna; Acraea marmorata Grose-Smith and Kirby, 1892; Acraea turna lacteata Le Cerf, 1927; Acraea turna lacteata f. scioptera Le Cerf, 1927

= Acraea turna =

Species of butterfly

Acraea turna is a butterfly in the family Nymphalidae. It is found on Madagascar.

== Description ==
A. turna Mab. is a broad-winged species with the ground-colour of both wings milk-white and an expanse of about 60 mm.; distal margin of the forewing distinctly emarginate; both wings with marginal band not sharply defined, blackish above, grey beneath, and with light marginal spots, which, however, are often very small or indistinct on the upperside of the hindwing; forewing darkened at the base to beyond the middle of the cell, black-grey above, reddish in the cell beneath; two transverse spots in the cell and the discal dots large and black, discal dots 3 to 6 united with the median spot into an irregular transverse band, which is often joined both to the costal margin and the marginal band; basal and discal dots of the hindwing rather small, but all present and normally arranged; the discal dot in 4 placed close to the marginal band. Madagascar, ab. marmorata Smith only differs in having the ground-colour of both wings light yellow to sulphur-yellow. Madagascar.

== Biology ==
The habitat consists of forests.

== Taxonomy ==
Acraea turna is a member of the Acraea anemosa species group. The clade members are:

- Acraea anemosa
- Acraea pseudolycia
- Acraea turna

Classification of Acraea by Henning, Henning & Williams, Pierre. J. & Bernaud

- Acraea (group anemosa) Henning, 1993
- Acraea (Acraea) Henning & Williams, 2010
- Acraea (Acraea) ( subgroup zetes) Pierre & Bernaud, 2013
- Acraea (Acraea) Groupe zetes Pierre & Bernaud, 2014
