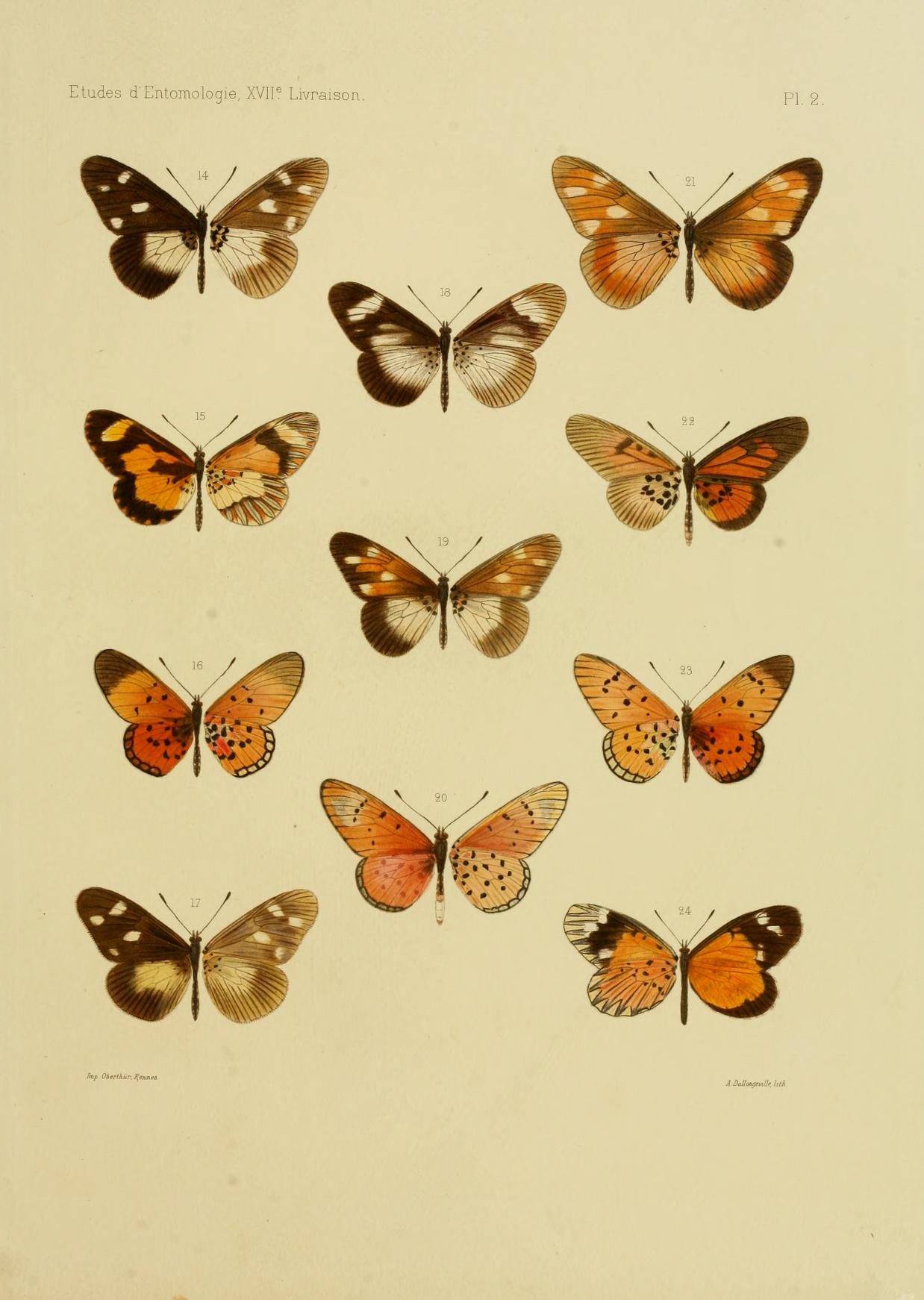
- Figure 16

Scientific classification
- Kingdom: Animalia
- Phylum: Arthropoda
- Class: Insecta
- Order: Lepidoptera
- Family: Nymphalidae
- Genus: Acraea
- Species: A. chaeribula

Binomial name
- Acraea chaeribula Oberthür, 1893

Synonyms
- Acraea cepheus chaeribula Pierre, 1979

= Acraea chaeribula =

Species of butterfly

Acraea chaeribula is a butterfly in the family Nymphalidae. It is found in southern Tanzania, Malawi, Zambia and the Democratic Republic of the Congo (Haut-Lomani, Lualaba, Haut-Shaba).

== Description ==
A. chaeribula Oberth. (55 b) is very similar to certain forms of the next species [ Acraea acrita ], only differing in the very large and deep black apical spot on the upperside of the forewing. Discal dots 3 to 6 of the forewing are absent and the marginal band of the hindwing is light-spotted. The ground-colour is in the male orange- yellow, in the female sometimes dull dark brown, only yellowish behind the cell of the forewing. Rhodesia, southern Congo, Nyassaland and German East Africa.

The habitat consists of Brachystegia woodland.(Miombo)

== Taxonomy ==
Acraea chaeribula is a member of the Acraea acrita species group. The other clade members are:

- Acraea chaeribula
- Acraea acrita
- Acraea eltringhamiana
- Acraea guluensis
- Acraea lualabae
- Acraea manca
- Acraea pudorina
- Acraea utengulensis

Classification of Acraea by Henning, Henning & Williams, Pierre. J. & Bernaud

- Acraea (group acrita) Henning, 1993
- Acraea (Rubraea) Henning & Williams, 2010
- Acraea (Acraea) (subgroup acrita) Pierre & Bernaud, 2013
- Acraea (Acraea) Groupe egina Pierre & Bernaud, 2014
