= Acraea barberi =

Barber's acraea
- Acraea barberi and related species

Conservation status
- Least Concern (IUCN 3.1)

Scientific classification
- Kingdom: Animalia
- Phylum: Arthropoda
- Clade: Pancrustacea
- Class: Insecta
- Order: Lepidoptera
- Family: Nymphalidae
- Genus: Acraea
- Species: A. barberi

Binomial name
- Acraea barberi Trimen, 1881

Synonyms
- Acraea zetes barberi

Species of butterfly

Acraea barberi, or Barber's acraea, is a butterfly of the family Nymphalidae. It is found in South Africa only in hilly wooded savannah in Gauteng, Limpopo and North West.

The wingspan is 55–66 mm for males and 60–72 mm for females. Adults are on wing from October to December with peaks in October and February.

The larvae feed on Adenia glauca.

Acraea barberi is a member of the Acraea zetes species group- but see also Pierre & Bernaud, 2014
