= Friedrich Thurau =

German entomologist

Friedrich Thurau (1843–1913) was a German entomologist.

He specialised in butterflies. His collection of Palearctic lepidoptera is in Museum für Naturkunde in Berlin.

== Works ==
partial list

- Colias nastes Bsd. var. werdandi Zett. und ihre Aberratione. Berl. ent. Z. 48, pp. [113-116]
- Neue Rhopaloceren aus Ost Afrika. Ergebnisse der Nyassa-See-un Kenya-Gebirgs-Expedition der Hermann und Elise geb. Heckmann-Wentzel-Stiftung Berl. ent. Z. 48 : 117-143 (1903).
- Neue Lepidopteren aus Ost- und Central-Afrika, im Königl. zoologischen Museum zu Berlin Berl. ent. Z. 48 : 301-314 (1903)
- Berl. ent. Z. online.
