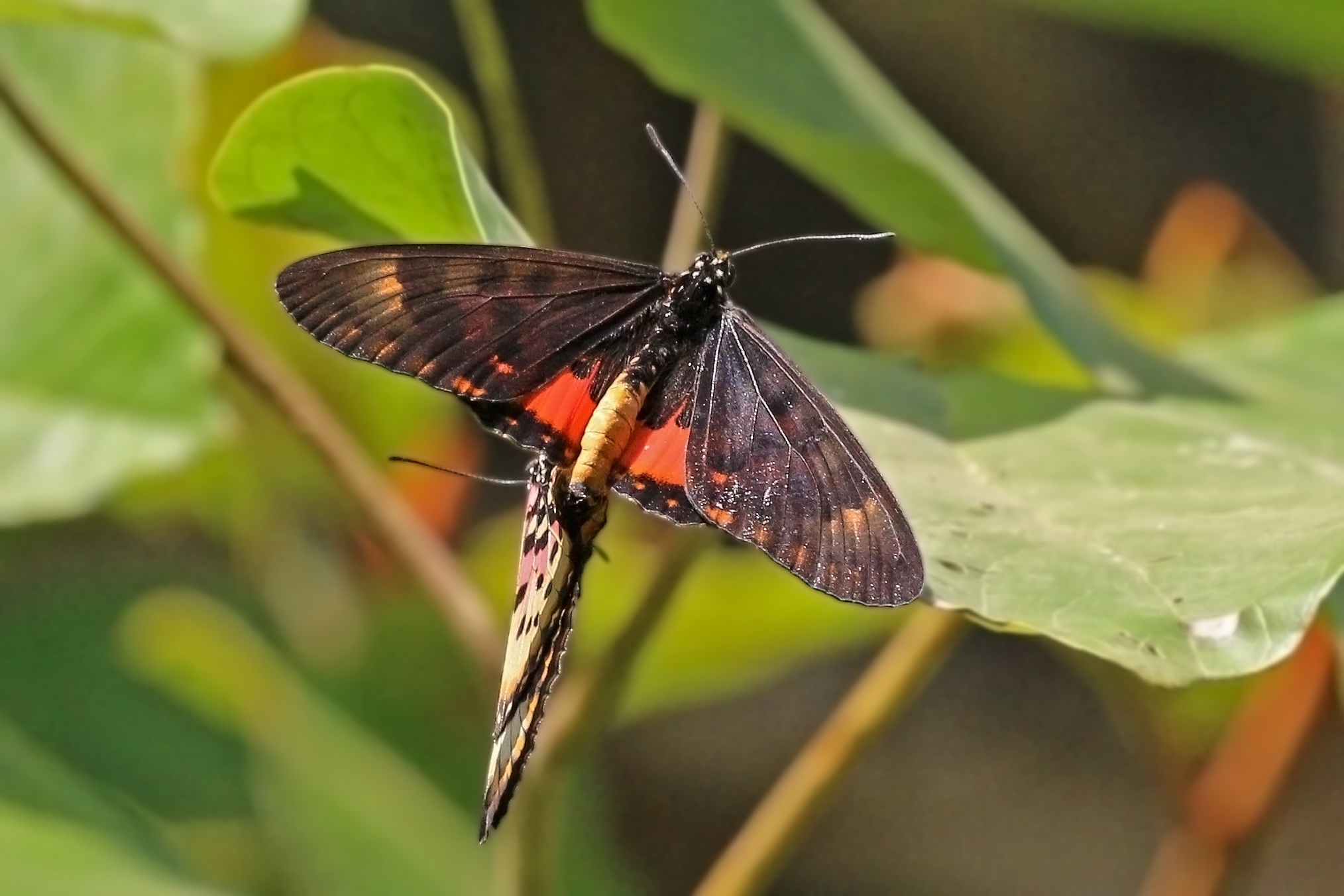

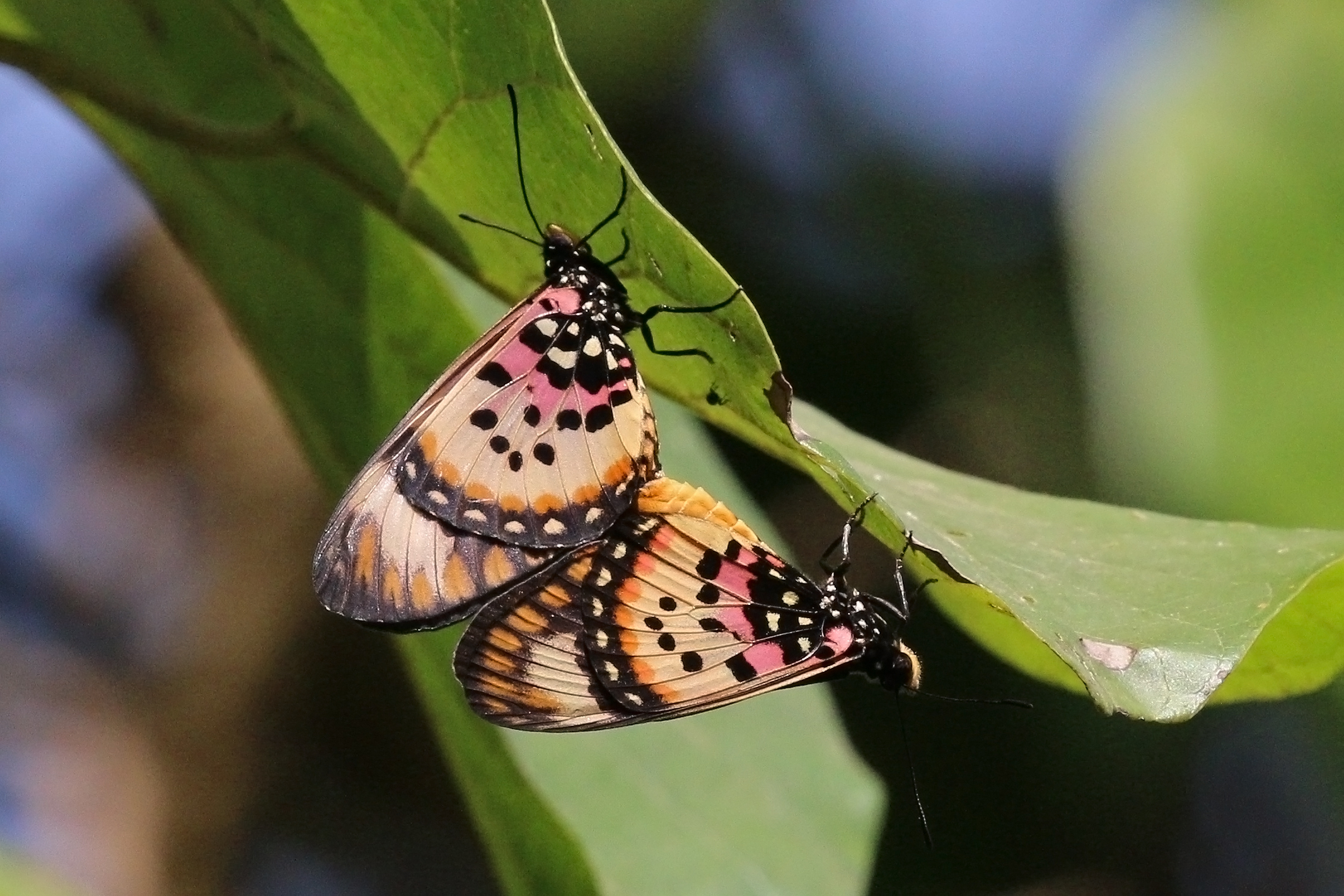
- Mating both images A. z. zetes, The Gambia

Scientific classification
- Kingdom: Animalia
- Phylum: Arthropoda
- Clade: Pancrustacea
- Class: Insecta
- Order: Lepidoptera
- Family: Nymphalidae
- Genus: Acraea
- Species: A. zetes

Binomial name
- Acraea zetes (Linnaeus, 1758)

Synonyms
- Papilio zetes Linnaeus, 1758; Acraea (Acraea) zetes; Papilio menippe Drury, 1782; Telchinia mycenaea Hübner, 1819; Acraea jalema Godart, 1819

= Acraea zetes =

Large spotted acraea

Species of butterfly

Acraea zetes, the large spotted acraea, is a butterfly in the family Nymphalidae which is native to sub-Saharan Africa.

== Range ==
It is found in Senegal, Gambia, Guinea-Bissau, Guinea, Sierra Leone, Burkina Faso, Liberia, Ivory Coast, Ghana, Togo, Benin, Nigeria, Cameroon, Equatorial Guinea, São Tomé and Príncipe, Angola, Namibia, the Democratic Republic of the Congo, Sudan, Ethiopia, Uganda, Kenya, Malawi and Zambia.

== Description ==
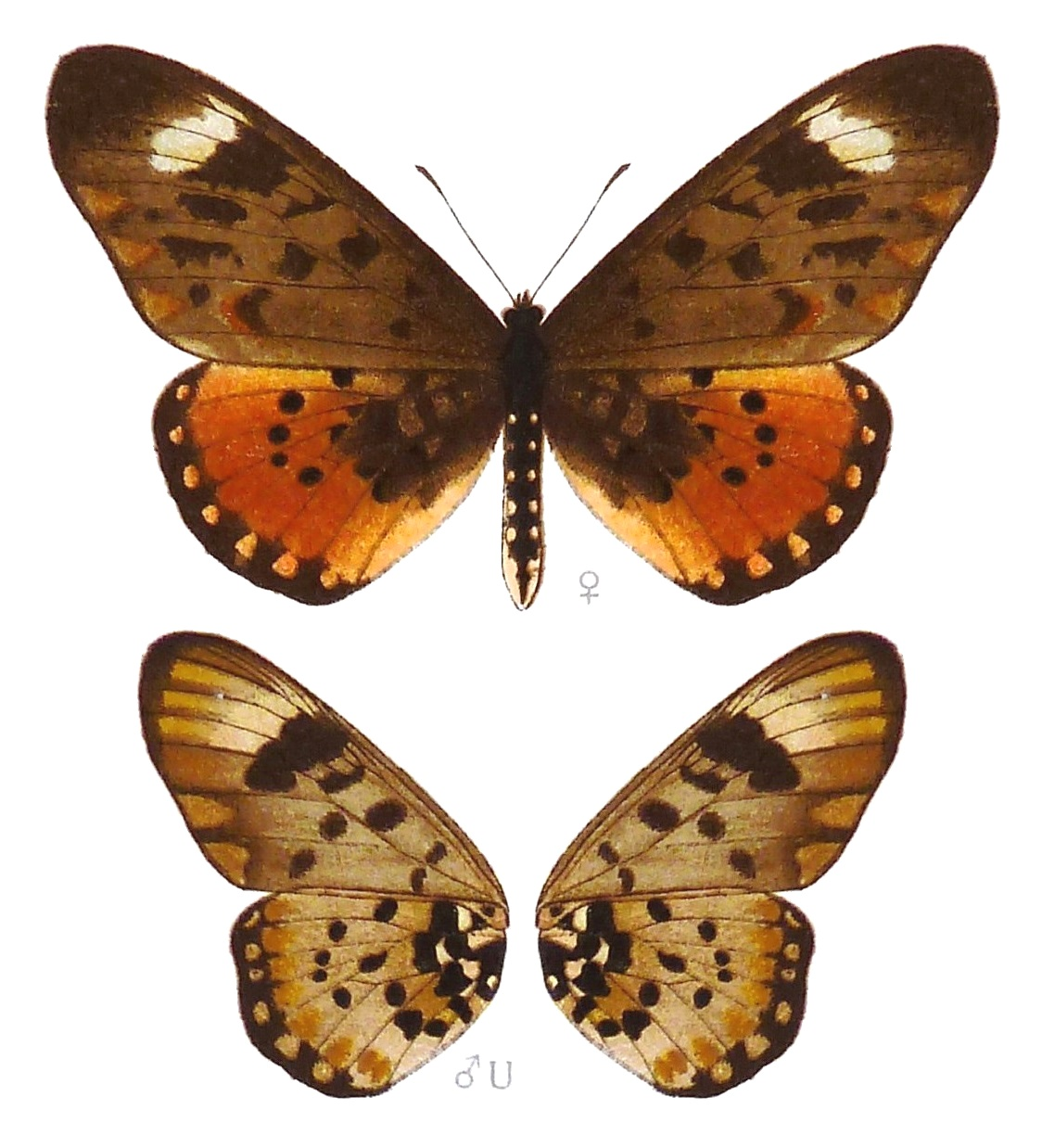

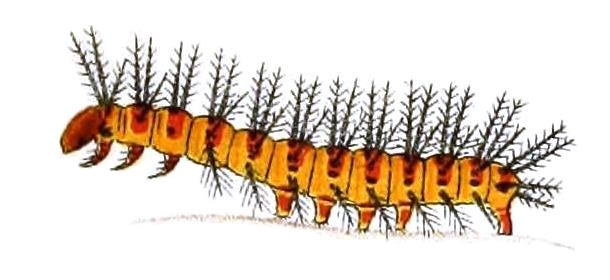
Female and male (wing undersides) imagos in Seitz (1900) and the larva (nom. subsp.) in Eltringham (1912)

A. zetes is a common species in Africa, distributed from Sierra Leone to Natal and Abyssinia; it develops several races and forms and is darkest in the north-west, gradually becoming lighter and lighter towards the south and east. Forewing with 2 black spots in the cell, one at its apex, large elongate discal dots in 3 to 6 and 10, rounded free discal dots in 1b and 2 and at least beneath with large yellow marginal spots in 1b to 6. Hindwing in addition to the confluent basal dots with a median dot and distinct discal dots, of which the one in 2 is placed close to the base of the cellule and that in 4 further distad than the rest; the black marginal band broad on both surfaces or at least beneath with light spots.

- zetes L. Forewing above dark blackish, unicolorous or beyond discal dots 3 to 6 a little lighter; discal dots little distinct on the dark ground. Hindwing above black to the apex of the cell, then with orange-red median band 5 to 6 mm. in breadth, in which only discal dots 3 to 5 are placed free, beneath with whitish ground colour and reddish spots in the basal area and on the marginal band. Sierra Leone to the Cameroons; transitions to menippe.
- menippe Drury (54 b). Forewing above with distinct red-yellow marginal spots and usually also with larger or smaller red-yellow spots in lb, 2 and the cell and with small whitish subapical band in 4 to 6; the red-yellow transverse band on the upperside of the hindwing 10 to 12 mm. in breadth. The female is larger and has the ground-colour black-grey on the forewing, grey-yellowish on the hindwing. Throughout West Africa to Angola and Uganda.
- jalema Godt. is an intermediate form between menippe and acara [ now Acraea acara ], and has the forewing above black at the base to vein 2 and then a red-yellow transverse band about 12 to 13 mm. in breadth, which extends from the inner margin to the anterior margin of the cell, covers the base of cellules 2 and 3 and encloses 4 black spots (one in the cell, the median spot and discal dots 1b and 2); subapical band, as in menippe, short and narrow. Cameroons to Rhodesia.
- acara Hew. (54 b, c) [ now species Acraea acara ] is the South and East African race and only differs from jalema in having the red-yellow colour on the upper surface even more extended and particularly in the fore wing having a large red-yellow subapical band about 7 mm. in breadth in 4 to 6; forewing at the apex black for a breadth of about 6 mm. Natal to Rhodesia, Nyassaland and British East Africa
- ab. mhondana Suff. [ Acraea acara ] Discal spots 4 to 6 of the forewing united with the black spot at the end of the cell. Among acara. ab. caffra Fldr. [ Acraea acara ] (= tescea Suff. [ Acraea acara ]) only differs from acara in having the upperside of the hindwing whitish in the middle. Natal; Transvaal.
- f. barberi Trim. [ Acraea barberi ] differs from acara in the forewing above having at the apex a marginal band only 2 mm. in breadth; the black lunulate submarginal line on the upperside of the forewing is sometimes strongly developed, sometimes entirely absent, ab. trimeni Auriv. [ Acraea barberi ] Transvaal and Griqualand.
- sidamona Rothsch. and Jord. is similar to acara only differing in having the basal dots in the cell and in 1 b of the forewing free and the marginal dots on the underside of the forewing in 1b to 5 all completely bordered with black proximally. Abyssinia.
- The larva of zetes is orange-yellow with a dark red transverse band dorsally on each segment; head glossy red; spines black; lives in Natal on Passiflora. Pupa reddish white with black markings.

== Subspecies ==
- Acraea zetes zetes — Senegal, Gambia, Guinea-Bissau, Guinea, Sierra Leone, Burkina Faso, Liberia, Ivory Coast, Ghana, Togo, Benin, Nigeria, Cameroon, Angola, northern Namibia, Democratic Republic of the Congo, southern Sudan, Uganda, western Kenya, Malawi, Zambia
- Acraea zetes annobona d'Abrera, 1980 — Equatorial Guinea: island of Annobon, São Tomé and Príncipe: island of São Tomé
- Acraea zetes rudolfi Eltringham, 1929 — northern Kenya and possibly north-eastern Uganda
- Acraea zetes sidamona Rothschild & Jordan, 1905 — Ethiopia

Torben Larsen developed a species numbering system for his 2005 publication Butterflies of West Africa. The nominate subspecies is #1180. The 'Larsen' numbers have since been used with permission in A Sharp Eye on Butterflies of Ghana.

== Biology ==
The habitat consists of open deciduous forests and woodland savanna.

The larvae feed on Theobroma cacao, Basananthe zanzibaricum, Adenia cisampelloides, Adenia lobata, Barteria acuminata, Phyllobotryum spathulatum, Smeathmannia, Passiflora, Deidama, Tacsonia and Hydnocarpus species

== Taxonomy ==
It is a member of the Acraea zetes species group- but see also Pierre & Bernaud, 2014

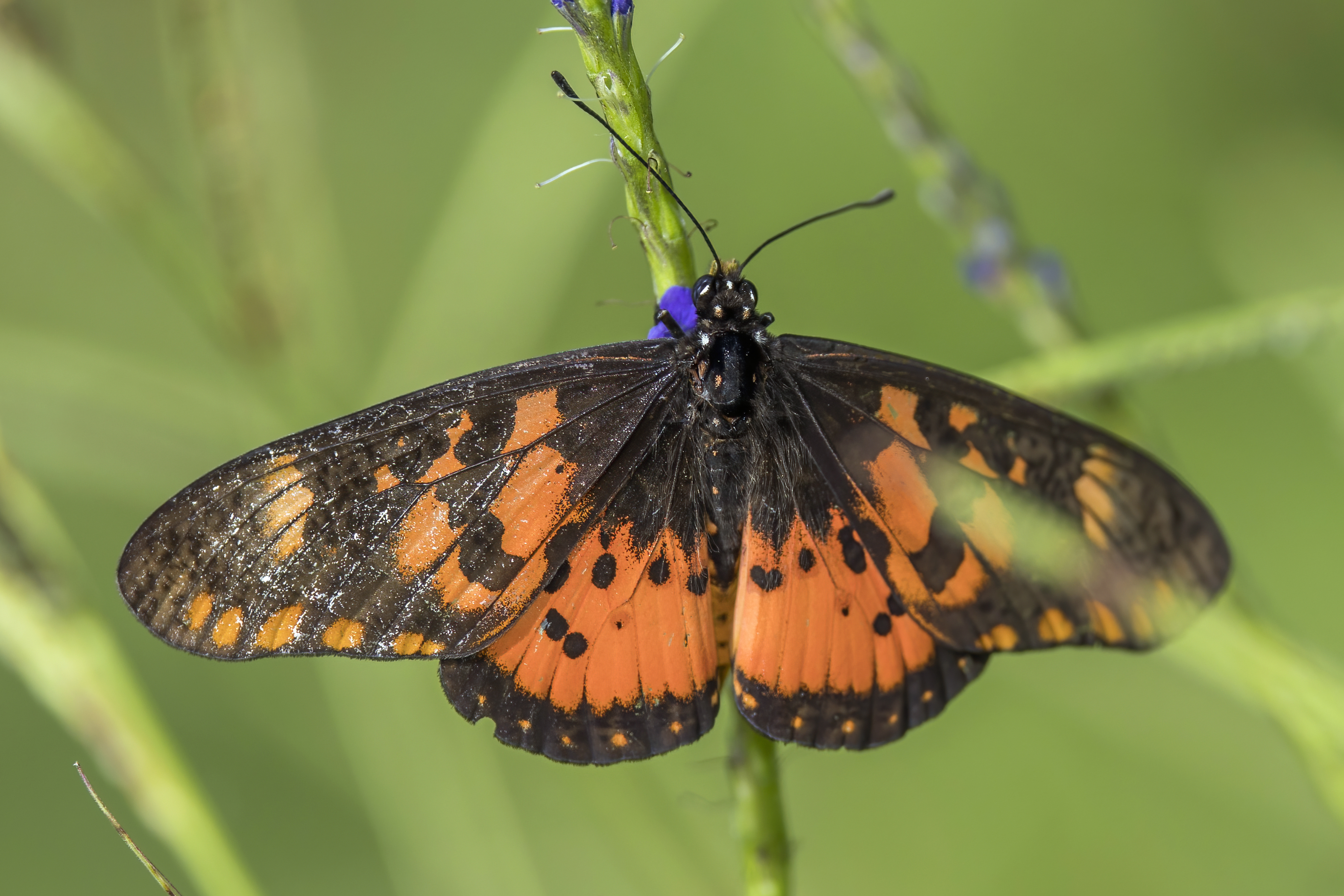
A. z. anobonna upper side

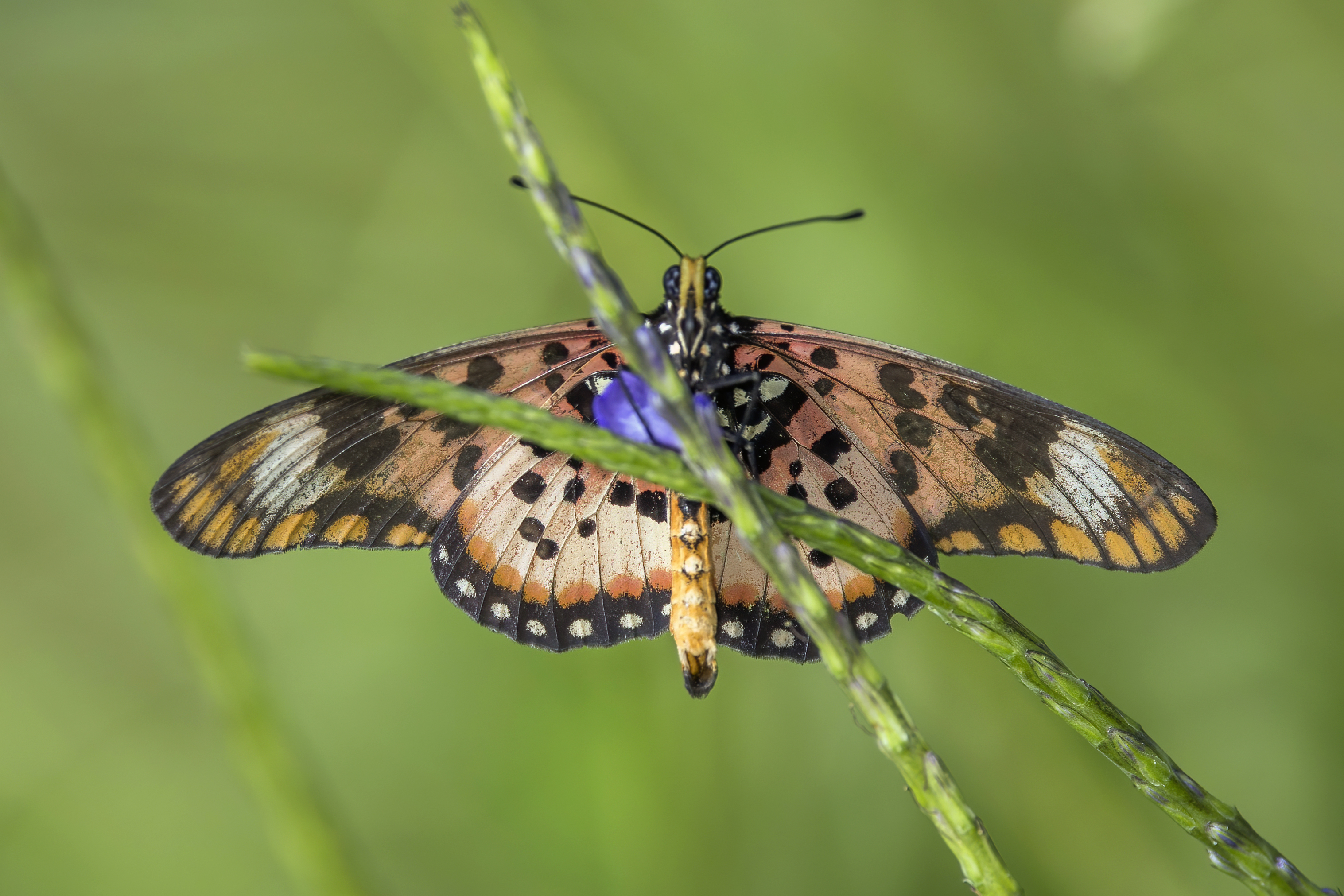
and underside São Tomé and Príncipe
