= Charles Le Doux =

German entomologist (born 1876)

Charles Le Doux (17 October 1876 – ?) was a German entomologist.

Le Doux was born in Berlin. He specialised in Lepidoptera especially the genus Acraea. His butterfly collections are held by Museum für Naturkunde in Berlin and his African Coleoptera by the National Museum of Natural History in Washington D.C., United States.

== Works ==
Partial list

- (1922) Acraeen-Studien 1 (Lep. Rhop.). 1. Die Identitat der Acraea violae F. (Indien) und Ac.neobule D.u.H. (Afrika). Deutsche Entomologische Zeitschrift 1922:297-316.
- (1923) Acraeen-Studien II (Lep. Rhop.). 1. Der Formenkreis von Acraea caldarena Hew. Deutsche Entomologische Zeitschrift 1923:207-226.
- (1923) Neue Formen von Pieris zochalia Bsd. und Eronia cleodora Hbn. Deutsche Entomologische Zeitschrift 1923:582-584.
- (1928) Acraeen-Studien III (Lep. Rhop.). 1. Der Nomenklatuur und der Formenkreis von Acraea eponina Cr. Deutsche Entomologische Zeitschrift 1928:97-115.
- (1929) Beitrage zur Kenntis der afrikanischen Teracoliden (Lep. Rhop). Mitteilungen aus dem Zoologischen Museum in Berlin 15:1-11.
- (1931) Neue Acraeinae aus Afrika und Madagascar (Lepidopt. Rhopal.). Deutsche Entomologische Zeitschrift 1931:49-59.
- (1931) Eine neue Subspecies von Acraea chilo Godm. aus Sud-Arabien (Lep. Acr.) Acraea chilo yemensis le Doux. Mitteilungen der Deutschen Entomologischen Gesellschaft 2:42-43.
- (1931) Acraeen-Studien IV. Der Nomenklatuur und der Formenkreise von Acraea encedon L. und Acraea lycia F. (Lepid. Rhopal.). Mitteilungen aus dem Zoologischen Museum in Berlin 17:239-272.
- (1932) Neue Acraeinae (Lepid. Rhopal.) aus Afrika. Mitteilungen der Deutschen Entomologischen Gesellschaft 3:4-7.
- (1932) Acraeen-Studien V (Lep. Rhopal.). Eine Monographie des Rassenkreises Acraea acrita Hewitson. Mitteilungen aus dem Zoologischen Museum in Berlin 18:172-225.
- (1933) Eine neue Acraea aus Sud-Arabien. Mitteilungen der Munchener Entomologischen Gesellschaft 23:35-36.
- (1937):Acraeen-Studien VI (Lep. Rhop.). Beitrag zur Kenntnis der Acraeinen Fauna Afrikas besonders des Belgischen Congos. Die Gattung Planema Doubl. Revue de Zoologie et de Botanique Africaine 29:151-187.
