= List of butterflies of the Comoros =

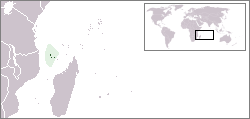
Location of the Comoros

This is a list of butterflies of the Comoro Islands. About 88 species are known from the Comoros, 19 of which are endemic.

This is a list of butterfly species which have been recorded on the Comoros and on Mayotte, which is geographically part of the Comoro Islands.

== Papilionidae ==
=== Papilioninae ===
==== Papilionini ====
- Papilio aristophontes Oberthür, 1897 (endemic)
- Papilio dardanus humbloti Oberthür, 1888
- Papilio demodocus Esper, [1798]
- Papilio epiphorbas guyonnaudi Turlin & Guilbot, 1990
- Papilio epiphorbas praedicta Turlin & Guilbot, 1990

==== Leptocercini ====
- Graphium evombar viossati Collins, 1997
- Graphium angolanus (Goeze, 1779)
- Graphium levassori (Oberthür, 1886) (endemic)

== Pieridae ==
=== Coliadinae ===
- Eurema brigitta pulchella (Boisduval, 1833)
- Eurema desjardinsii (Boisduval, 1833)
- Eurema floricola anjuana (Butler, 1879)
- Eurema hecabe solifera (Butler, 1875)
- Catopsilia florella (Fabricius, 1775)

=== Pierinae ===
- Colotis euippe omphale (Godart, 1819)
- Colotis evanthe (Boisduval, 1836)
- Colotis evanthides (Holland, 1896)

==== Pierini ====
- Appias epaphia contracta (Butler, 1888)
- Appias sabina comorensis Talbot, 1943
- Mylothris humbloti (Oberthür, 1888) (endemic)
- Mylothris ngaziya (Oberthür, 1888) (endemic)
- Belenois creona elisa (van Vollenhoven, 1869)

== Lycaenidae ==
=== Theclinae ===
==== Theclini ====
- Hypolycaena philippus ramonza (Saalmüller, 1878)
- Deudorix antalus (Hopffer, 1855)
- Deudorix dinochares Grose-Smith, 1887

=== Polyommatinae ===
==== Polyommatini ====
- Cacyreus darius (Mabille, 1877)
- Leptotes casca (Tite, 1958) (endemic)
- Leptotes mayottensis (Tite, 1958) (endemic)
- Zizina antanossa (Mabille, 1877)
- Actizera lucida (Trimen, 1883)
- Azanus sitalces mayotti d'Abrera, 1980
- Eicochrysops damiri Turlin, 1995 (endemic)
- Eicochrysops sanguigutta (Mabille, 1879)
- Euchrysops osiris (Hopffer, 1855)

== Nymphalidae ==
=== Danainae ===
==== Danaini ====
- Danaus chrysippus orientis (Aurivillius, 1909)
- Danaus dorippus (Klug, 1845)
- Amauris comorana Oberthür, 1897 (endemic)
- Amauris nossima (Ward, 1870)
- Amauris ochlea affinis Aurivillius, 1911
- Amauris ochlea moya Turlin, 1994

=== Satyrinae ===
==== Melanitini ====
- Melanitis leda (Linnaeus, 1758)

==== Satyrini ====
- Bicyclus anynana (Butler, 1879)
- Heteropsis comorana comorana (Oberthür, 1916) (endemic)
- Heteropsis comorana subrufa (Turlin, 1994) (endemic)
- Heteropsis narcissus fraterna (Butler, 1868)
- Heteropsis narcissus comorensis (Oberthür, 1916)
- Heteropsis narcissus salimi (Turlin, 1994)
- Heteropsis narcissus mayottensis (Oberthür, 1916)

=== Charaxinae ===
==== Charaxini ====
- Charaxes saperanus Poulton, 1926 (endemic)
- Charaxes castor comoranus Rothschild, 1903
- Charaxes paradoxa Lathy, 1925 (endemic)
- Charaxes nicati Canu, 1991 (endemic)
- Charaxes viossati Canu, 1991 (endemic)

=== Nymphalinae ===
==== Nymphalini ====
- Junonia goudotii (Boisduval, 1833)
- Junonia oenone (Linnaeus, 1758)
- Junonia rhadama (Boisduval, 1833)
- Salamis humbloti Turlin, 1994 (endemic)
- Hypolimnas anthedon drucei (Butler, 1874)
- Hypolimnas misippus (Linnaeus, 1764)
- Vanessa dimorphica comoroica (Howarth, 1966)

=== Biblidinae ===
==== Biblidini ====
- Byblia anvatara (Boisduval, 1833)
- Eurytela dryope lineata Aurivillius, 1899

=== Limenitinae ===
==== Limenitidini ====
- Pseudacraea imerina anjouana Collins, 1991
- Pseudacraea lucretia comorana Oberthür, 1890
- Pseudacraea lucretia karthalae Collins, 1991

==== Neptidini ====
- Neptis comorarum comorarum Oberthür, 1890 (endemic)
- Neptis comorarum legrandi Turlin, 1994 (endemic)
- Neptis cormilloti Turlin, 1994 (endemic)
- Neptis mayottensis Oberthür, 1890 (endemic)

=== Heliconiinae ===
==== Acraeini ====
- Acraea serena (Fabricius, 1775)
- Acraea dammii van Vollenhoven, 1869
- Acraea igati Boisduval, 1833
- Acraea ranavalona Boisduval, 1833
- Acraea lia Mabille, 1879
- Acraea esebria Hewitson, 1861
- Acraea masaris masaris Oberthür, 1893 (endemic)
- Acraea masaris jodina Pierre, 1992 (endemic)
- Acraea comor Pierre, 1992 (endemic)

==== Vagrantini ====
- Phalanta eurytis (Doubleday, 1847)
- Phalanta phalantha aethiopica (Rothschild & Jordan, 1903)

== Hesperiidae ==
=== Coeliadinae ===
- Coeliades forestan (Stoll, [1782])
- Coeliades ramanatek comorana Evans, 1937

=== Pyrginae ===
==== Tagiadini ====
- Tagiades insularis grandis Evans, 1937
- Tagiades insularis mayotta Evans, 1937
- Tagiades samborana rana Evans, 1937
- Eagris sabadius comorana Evans, 1937
- Eagris sabadius isabella Turlin, 1995

=== Hesperiinae ===
==== Aeromachini ====
- Artitropa erinnys comorarum Oberthür, 1916

==== Baorini ====
- Pelopidas mathias (Fabricius, 1798)
- Borbo fatuellus dolens (Mabille, 1898)
- Borbo gemella (Mabille, 1884)

== See also ==
- List of moths of the Comoros
- Wildlife of the Comoros
