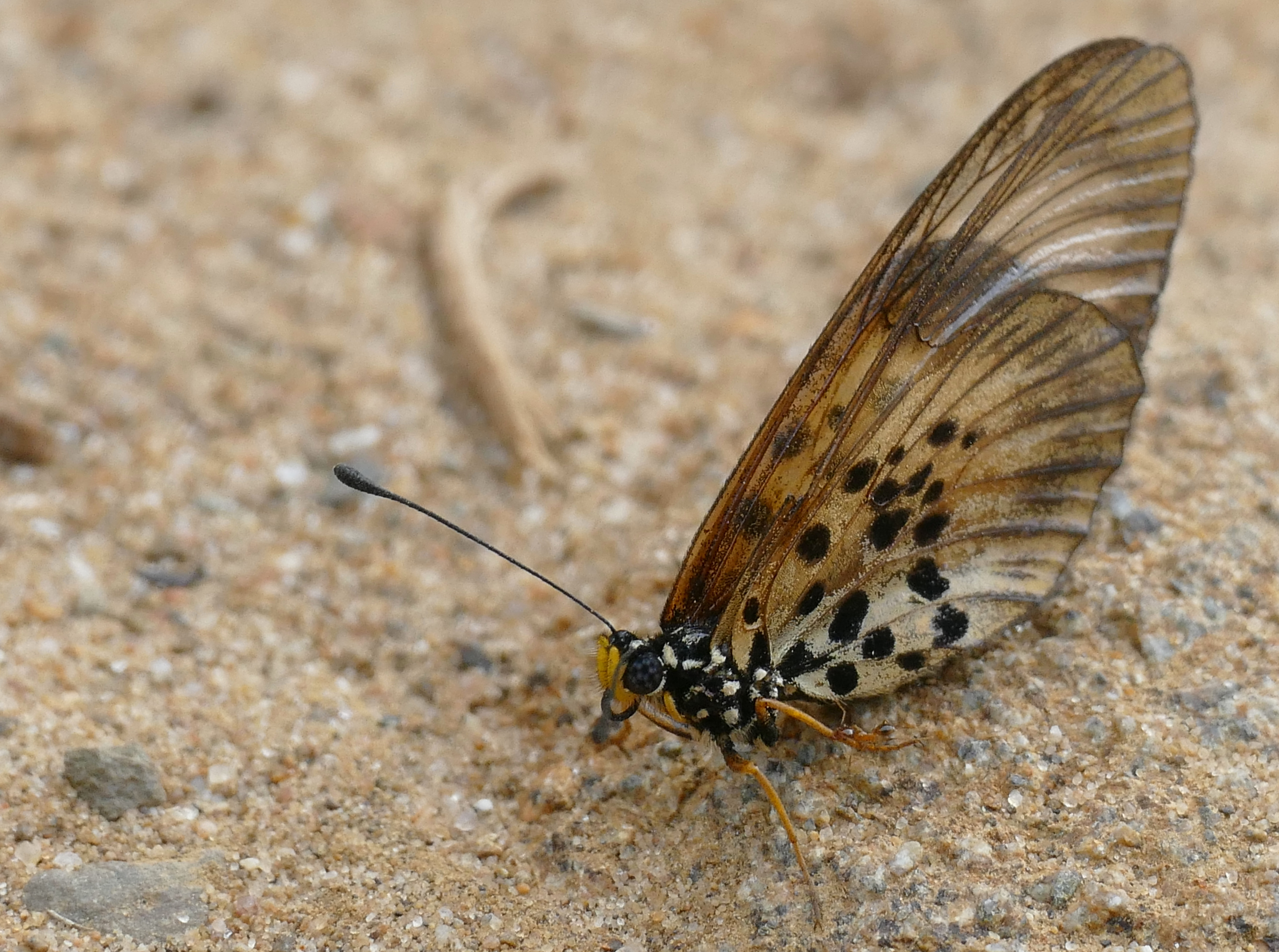

Scientific classification
- Kingdom: Animalia
- Phylum: Arthropoda
- Class: Insecta
- Order: Lepidoptera
- Family: Nymphalidae
- Genus: Acraea
- Species: A. burni

Binomial name
- Acraea burni Butler, 1896

Synonyms
- Acraea (Actinote) burni; Acraea obeira burni; Acraea obeira meyeri van Son, 1963; Acraea obeira meyerana Ackery, 1995

= Acraea burni =

Species of butterfly

Acraea burni, the pale-yellow acraea, is a butterfly of the family Nymphalidae.

The larvae feed on Laportea peduncularis, Pouzolzia mixta and Obetia tenax.

== Taxonomy ==
Acraea burni is sometimes treated as a subspecies of Acraea obeira. See that species for diagnosis. It is a member of the Acraea pentapolis species group. But see also Pierre & Bernaud, 2014.
