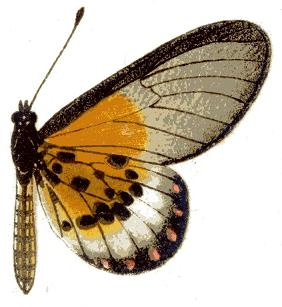

Scientific classification
- Kingdom: Animalia
- Phylum: Arthropoda
- Class: Insecta
- Order: Lepidoptera
- Family: Nymphalidae
- Genus: Acraea
- Species: A. obeira

Binomial name
- Acraea obeira Hewitson, 1863

Synonyms
- Hyalites obeira (Hewitson, 1863); Acrea piva Guenée, 1865; Acraea andromba Grose-Smith, 1891

= Acraea obeira =

Species of butterfly

Acraea obeira is a butterfly of the family Nymphalidae. It is found on Madagascar. Records from South Africa, Eswatini, Zimbabwe, eastern Zambia and southern Malawi refer to Acraea burni.

== Description ==
A. obeira Hew. (53 d) differs from A.lia in having the marginal band of the hindwing broader but not sharply defined, adorned wdth red or yellowish marginal spots and on the under surface not bounded proxi- mally by red spots; in the male the forewing is red-yellow at the base as far as vein 2 or 3, in the female almost entirely hyaline; the hindwing is red-yellow (male) or whitish yellow (female) from the base to the discal dots, then hyaline as far as the marginal hand or only scaled in cellules 1 c to 2, 6 and 7; discal dots 2 to 7 of the hindwing usually large and confluent. Madagascar. - burni Btlr. [ now species Acraea burni ] only differs in the male having the forewing to the apex of the cell and the hindwing as far as the marginal hand scaled with light ochre-yellowish. Natal.

== Taxonomy ==
It is a member of the Acraea pentapolis species group.- but see also Pierre & Bernaud, 2014
