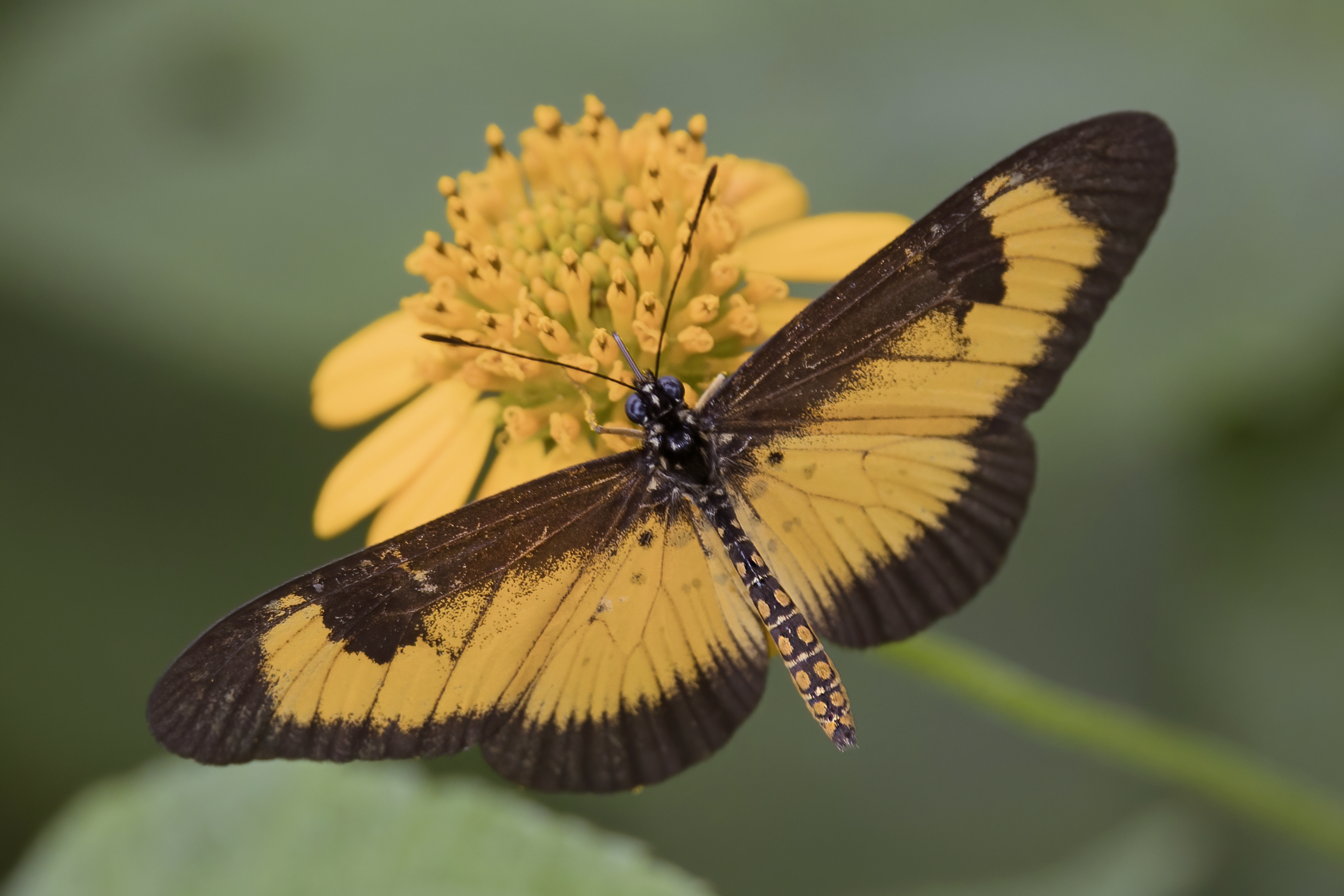

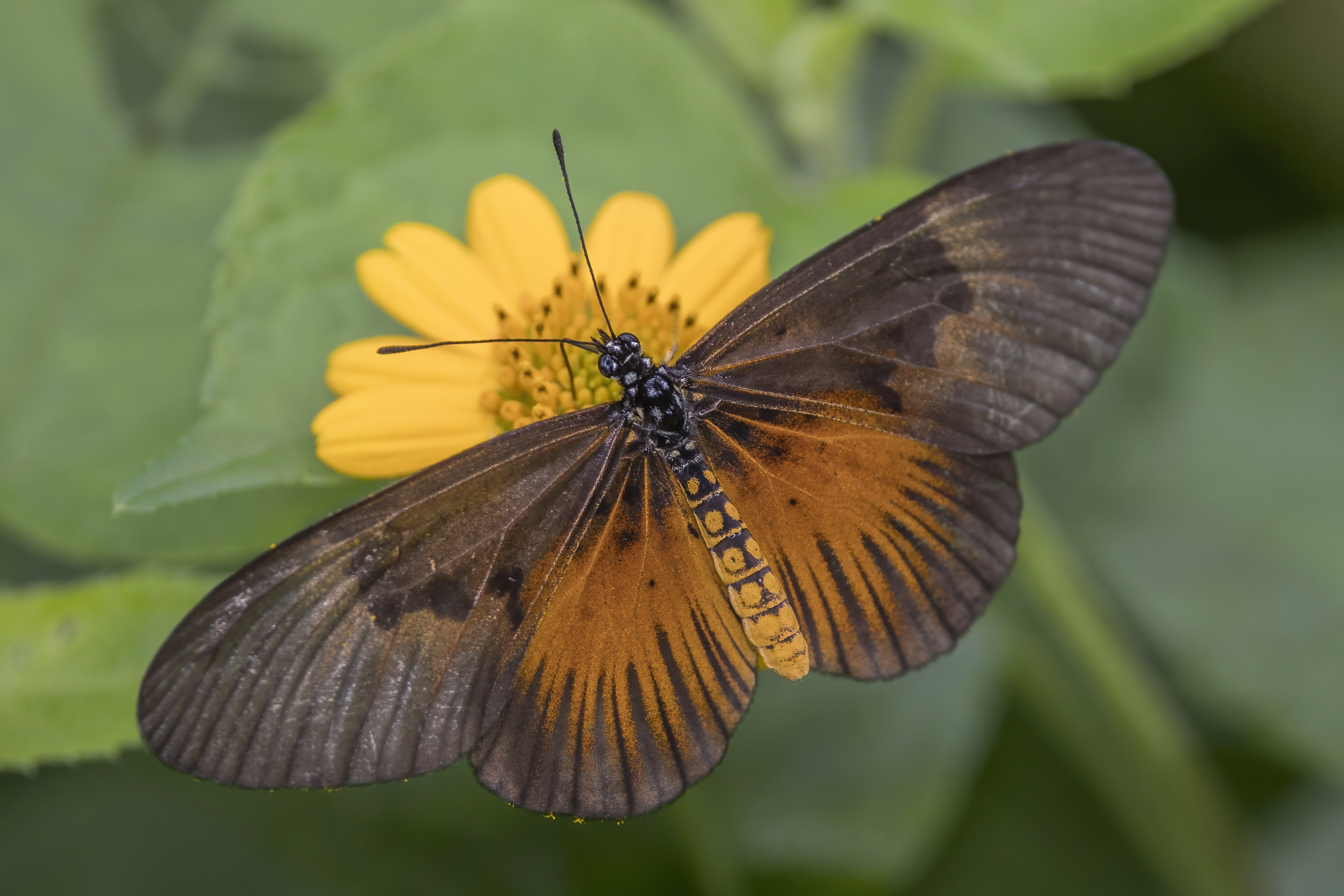
- Male and female A. alciope or A aurivillii both in Ghana

Scientific classification
- Kingdom: Animalia
- Phylum: Arthropoda
- Clade: Pancrustacea
- Class: Insecta
- Order: Lepidoptera
- Family: Nymphalidae
- Genus: Acraea
- Species: A. alciope

Binomial name
- Acraea alciope Hewitson, 1852

Synonyms
- Acraea (Actinote) alciope; Planema macarina Butler, 1868; Acraea cydonia Ward, 1873; Acraea alciope f. cretacea Eltringham, 1912; Acraea alciope f. fumida Eltringham, 1912; Acraea alciope f. edea Strand, 1914; Acraea alciope f. lomana Strand, 1914; Acraea alciope alciope ab. alberici Dufrane, 1945; Acraea alciope alciope f. vulpinopsis Birket-Smith, 1960

= Acraea alciope =

Hewitson's acraea

Species of butterfly

Acraea alciope, the Hewitson's acraea or alciope acraea, is a butterfly in the family Nymphalidae which is native to the African tropics and subtropics.

== Range ==
It is found in Guinea, Sierra Leone, Liberia, Ivory Coast, Ghana, Togo, Nigeria, Cameroon, Bioko, the Republic of the Congo, the Central African Republic, the Democratic Republic of the Congo, Rwanda, south-western Uganda and Zambia.

== Description ==
Acraea alciope Hew. (57 e). The female has developed several forms, but the male varies little. In the male the hindwing and the transverse band of the fore wing are light ochre-yellow and the dark marginal band on the upperside of the hindwing about 4 mm. in breadth. In the female the transverse band of the forewing is brown-yellow and distally incised; the hindwing is brown-yellow and has a broad dark marginal band as in the male. Ivory Coast to the Congo and Uganda.

- Female aberratio form macarina Btlr. (57 e) only differs from the typical male in having the dark marginal band on the upperside of the hindwing absent or at least posteriorly very narrow. Gold Coast to the Congo.
- Female aberratio form bakossua Strand [unavailable name]. Transverse band of the forewing in the anterior third white, narrower than usual. Cameroon mountains.
- Female aberratio form cretacea Eltringh. has a whitish transverse band on the forewing. Lagos.
- Female aberratio form fumida Eltringh. has both wings dark brown and almost without markings. Lagos.
- Female aberratio form aurivillii Stgr. (57e) [now species Acraea aurivillii]. Transverse band of the forewing orange-yellow, hindwing blackish with a white median band 5 mm. in breadth. Cameroons to Uganda.
- Female aberratio form latifasciata Grunb. [now Acraea aurivillii ab. latifasciata Grünberg, 1910] only differs from aurivillii in having the transverse band of the forewing not incised on the distal side, but almost entire-margined and broader. Sesse Islands.
- Female aberratio form fella Eltringh.[Acraea aurivillii] Transverse band of the fore wing orange-yellow; hindwing yellow-brown with the dark marginal band sharply defined but narrow and gradually decreasing in breadth towards the anal angle. Uganda.
- schecana Rothsch. & Jord. [now Acraea aurivillii ssp. schecana Rothschild & Jordan, 1905] seems to be a separate race occurring in Abyssinia; the male has the transverse band of the forewing lighter and the marginal band of the hindwing broader; female unknown.
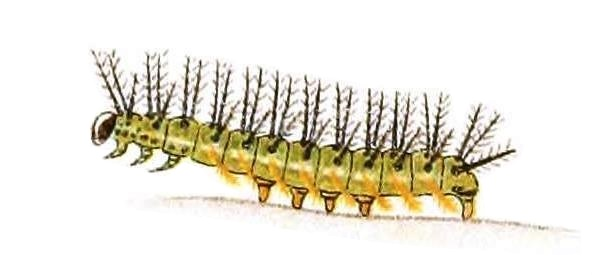
larva illustrated in Eltringham (1912)

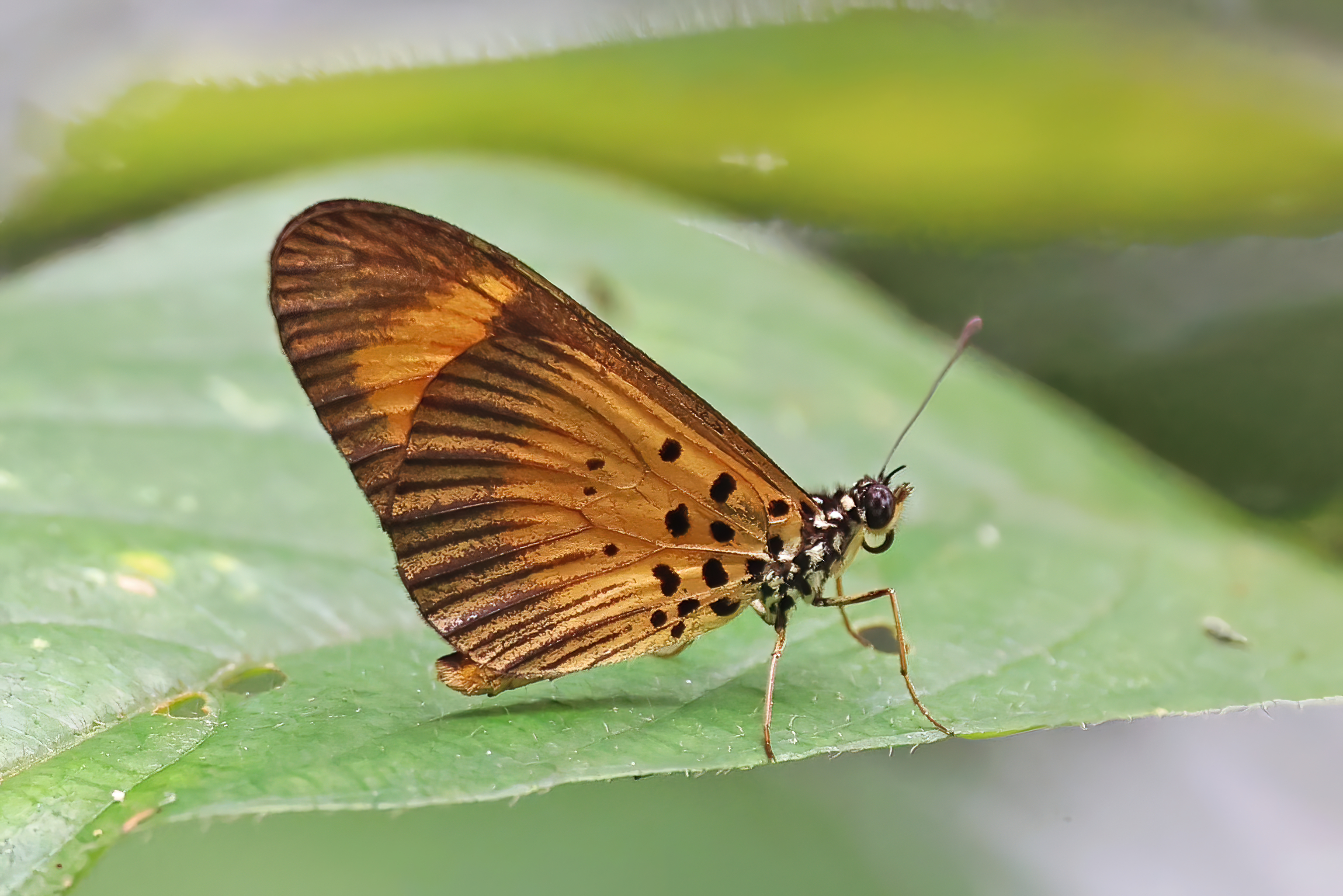
A. alciope or A aurivillii
male underside, Ghana

== Biology ==
The habitat consists of forests.

The larvae feed on Theobroma cacao, Fleurya and Musanga species.

== Taxonomy ==
It is a member of the Acraea jodutta species group – but see also Pierre & Bernaud, 2014

Torben Larsen developed a species numbering system for his 2005 publication Butterflies of West Africa. This species is #1155. The 'Larsen' number is used with permission in A Sharp Eye on Butterflies of Ghana, which indicates that A. alciope cannot be distinguished from A aurivillii by photographs alone.
