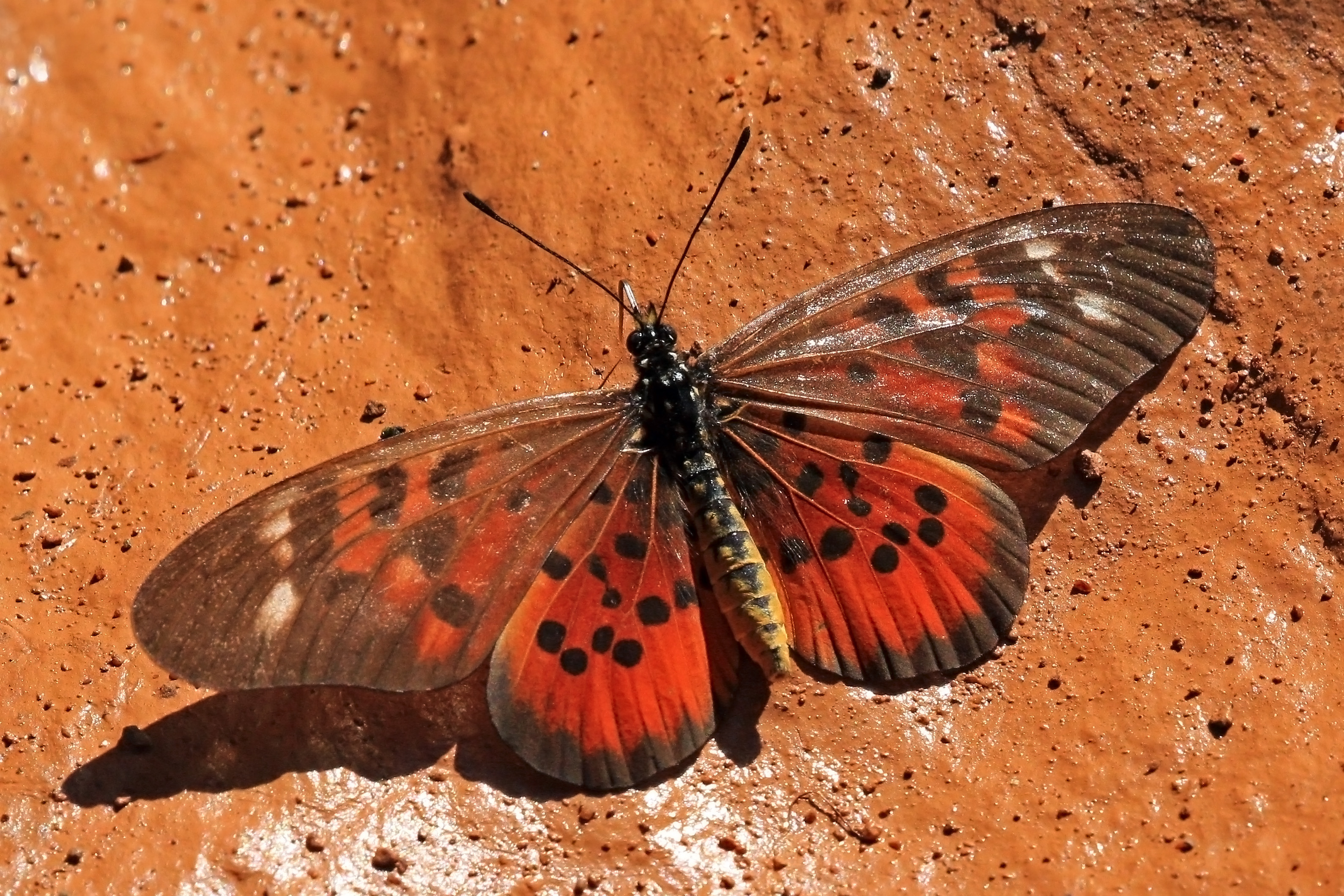

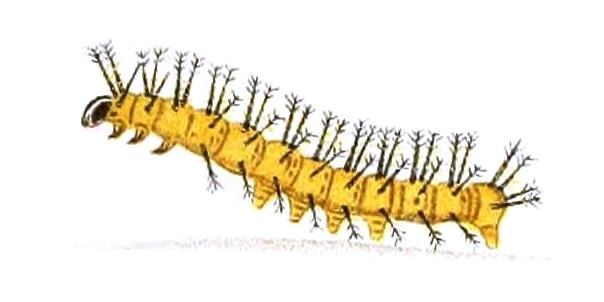
- Imago at Kakamega Forest, Kenya, and a larva from Lagos in Eltringham (1912)

Scientific classification
- Kingdom: Animalia
- Phylum: Arthropoda
- Clade: Pancrustacea
- Class: Insecta
- Order: Lepidoptera
- Family: Nymphalidae
- Genus: Acraea
- Species: A. pharsalus

Binomial name
- Acraea pharsalus Ward, 1871

Synonyms
- Acraea (Actinote) pharsalus; Acraea pharsalus f. duplicatus Stoneham, 1943; Acraea pharsaloides Holland, 1892; Acraea pharsalus saluspha Suffert, 1904; Acraea pharsalus var. pharsaloides ab. pallidepicta Strand, 1911; Acraea pharsalus var. pharsaloides ab. nia Strand, 1911; Acraea pharsalus f. ruperti O'Neil, 1919

= Acraea pharsalus =

Pharsalus acraea

Species of butterfly

Acraea pharsalus, the east African forest acraea or Pharsalus acraea, is a butterfly in the family Nymphalidae which is native to the tropics and subtropics of Africa.

== Range ==
It is found in Guinea, Sierra Leone, Liberia, Ivory Coast, Ghana, Togo, Nigeria, Cameroon, Equatorial Guinea, São Tomé and Príncipe, the Democratic Republic of the Congo, Sudan, Uganda, Kenya, Tanzania, Malawi, Ethiopia, Angola, Zambia and Mozambique.

== Description ==
A. pharsalus Ward. (56 d). Upper surface of both wings dusted with black at the base; forewing above very broadly black at the apex and distal margin with small whitish (occasionally reddish) subapical spots in 4 to 6 and large discal dots in 1b to 6, of which those in cellules 4 to 6 are scarcely distinguishable from the ground-colour; cell with a black spot in the middle and one at the apex; the middle of the forewing and the greater part of the hindwing above red, the hindwing with black marginal band; forewing beneath reddish grey, at the apex and distal margin yellowish with black veins and marginal streaks; hindwing beneath at the base and distal margin greenish light grey, in the middle slightly reddish with well developed basal and discal dots and large triangular spots at the distal margin on the interneural folds. Larva above red-yellow, beneath lighter, with black dorsal line and small black striae at the anterior and posterior margin of each segment; head and spines black. Pupa light yellowish with black markings. Senegal to Angola, Nyassaland and Uganda.

- pharsaloides Holl. (= saluspha Suff.) is the East African race and only differs in having the light subapical band of the forewing much larger and red, connected with the red ground-colour by a spot of the same colour in 3; hence the black discal dots in cellules 3 to 6 appear as independent spots; the base of both wings above is less dusted with black than in the type-form. In the female the ground-colour of the upper surface is often grey-yellowish. Angola, German and British East Africa.
- ab. pallidepicta Strand Subapical band of the forewing whitish. German East Africa.
- ab. nia Strand, forms in certain respects the transition to vuilloti, as the hindwing has a light yellowish patch in the same position as in the latter. German East Africa: Amani.
- vuilloti Mab. [now species Acraea vuilloti ](56 d). The ground-colour of the forewing is often completely broken up into spots and the hindwing has a large white spot at the inner margin in cellules 1b to 2 (to 3). Hindwing also beneath with dark marginal band. Marginal streaks thick, but not triangular. German East Africa.
- rhodina Rothsch. Forewing as in vuilloti; hindwing also similarly marked, but without white area. Abyssinia.

== Biology ==
The habitat consists of forests and riverine vegetation in Guinea savanna.

Adults have been recorded from July to September.

The larvae feed on Theobroma cacao, Tectona grandis, Ficus exasperata, Ficus aspersifolia, Ficus sycomorus, Laportea peduncularis, Fleurya ovalifolia and Boehmeria species.

== Subspecies ==
- Acraea pharsalus pharsalus — Guinea, Sierra Leone, Liberia, Ivory Coast, Ghana, Togo, Nigeria, Cameroon, Equatorial Guinea: Bioko and Annobón, Angola, northern Democratic Republic of the Congo, southern Sudan, Uganda, western Kenya, Tanzania, northern Zambia
- Acraea pharsalus carmen Pyrcz, 1991 — Equatorial Guinea: island of Príncipe
- Acraea pharsalus pharsaloides Holland, 1892 — eastern Kenya, Tanzania, Malawi, Mozambique
- Acraea pharsalus rhodina Rothschild, 1902 — Ethiopia, Sudan: south to the Boma plateau

Torben Larsen developed a species numbering system for his 2005 publication Butterflies of West Africa. The nominate subspecies is #1152. The 'Larsen' numbers have since been used with permission in A Sharp Eye on Butterflies of Ghana.

== Taxonomy ==
It is a member of the Acraea pharsalus species group – but see also Pierre & Bernaud, 2014
