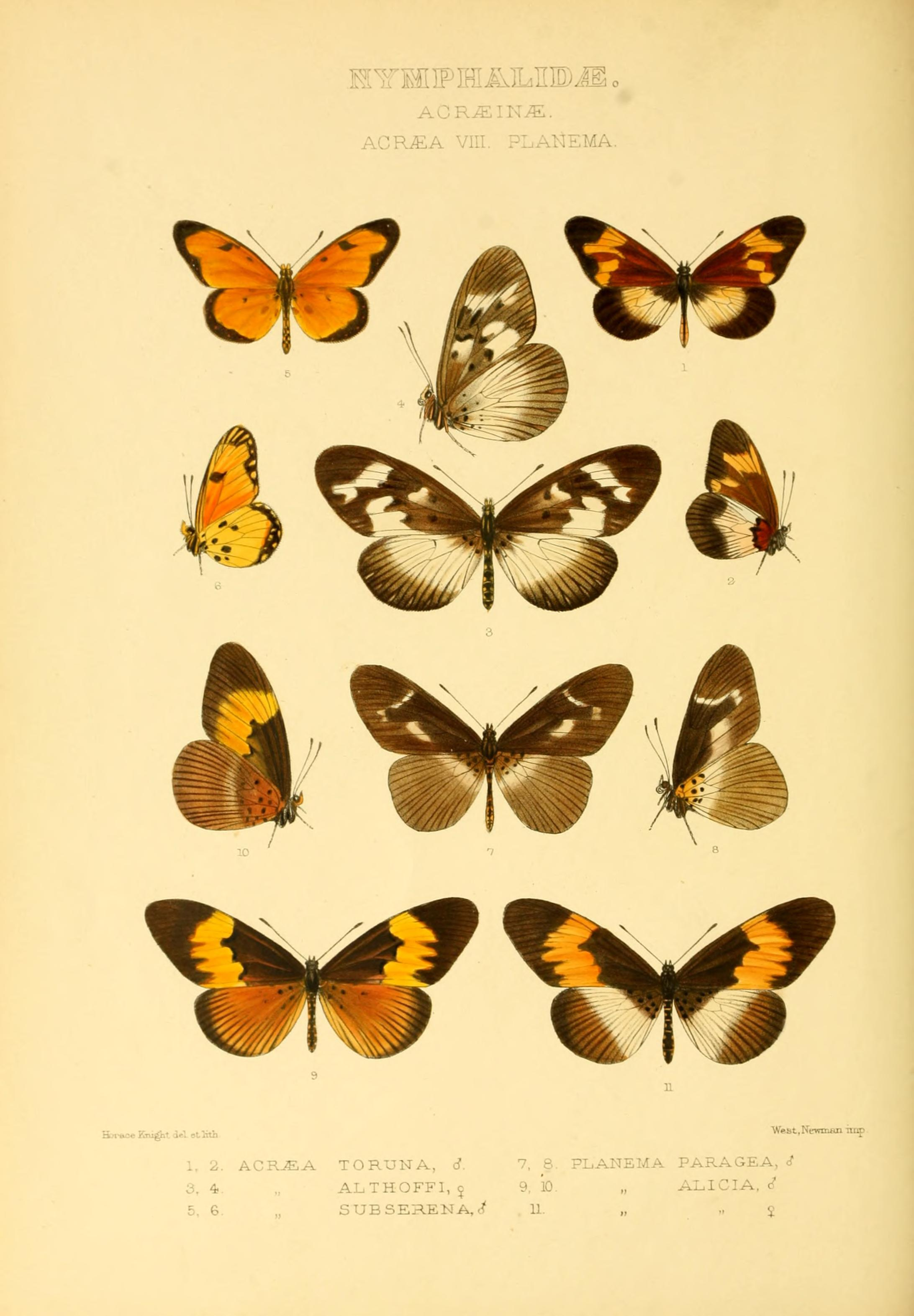
- Figures 9, 10 (male) and 11 (female) as Planema alicia

Scientific classification
- Kingdom: Animalia
- Phylum: Arthropoda
- Class: Insecta
- Order: Lepidoptera
- Family: Nymphalidae
- Genus: Acraea
- Species: A. aurivillii

Binomial name
- Acraea aurivillii Staudinger, 1896

Synonyms
- Acraea (Actinote) aurivillii; Planema alicia Grose-Smith, 1900; Acraea aurivillii ab. latifasciata Grünberg, 1910; Acraea alciope ab. bakossua Strand, 1912; Acraea alciope f. tella Eltringham, 1912; Planema smithi Aurivillius, 1922; Acraea alciope bombensis Stoneham, 1937; Acraea alciope ochrextensa Stoneham, 1937; Acraea alciope f. flavifasciata Stoneham, 1937; Acraea alciope f. vidua Ungemach, 1932

= Acraea aurivillii =

Species of butterfly

Acraea aurivillii, the large alciope acraea, is a butterfly in the family Nymphalidae. It is found in Sierra Leone, Liberia, Ivory Coast, Ghana, Nigeria, Cameroon, Gabon, the Republic of the Congo, the Central African Republic, the Democratic Republic of the Congo, Burundi, Uganda, Kenya, Tanzania, Zambia and Ethiopia. The habitat consists of forests.

The larvae feed on Laportea podocarpa, Urera flamigniana, Urera gravenreuthii, Urera thonneri, Pouzolzia denudata, Urera hypselodendron and Adenia species.

== Subspecies ==
- Acraea aurivillii aurivillii (Sierra Leone, Liberia, Ivory Coast, Ghana, Nigeria, Cameroon, Gabon, Congo, Central African Republic, southern and eastern Democratic Republic of the Congo, Burundi, Uganda, western Kenya, north-western Tanzania, Zambia)
- Acraea aurivillii schecana Rothschild & Jordan, 1905 (south-western Ethiopia)

== Similar species ==
- Acraea alciope q.v. for differences

== Taxonomy ==
It is a member of the Acraea jodutta species group - but see also Pierre & Bernaud, 2014

== Etymology ==
The name honours the Swedish entomologist Per Olof Christopher Aurivillius.
