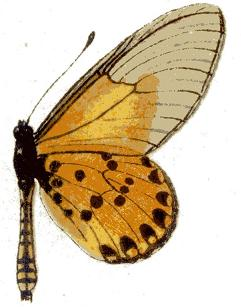

Conservation status
- Least Concern (IUCN 3.1)

Scientific classification
- Kingdom: Animalia
- Phylum: Arthropoda
- Class: Insecta
- Order: Lepidoptera
- Family: Nymphalidae
- Genus: Acraea
- Species: A. machequena

Binomial name
- Acraea machequena Grose-Smith, 1887

= Acraea machequena =

Machequena acraea

Species of butterfly

Acraea machequena, the machequena acraea, is a butterfly of the family Nymphalidae. It is found in Zimbabwe, Mozambique, Malawi, south-eastern Tanzania. It is also present in some areas of South Africa, the savannah in Limpopo and north of the Soutpansberg, as well as the lowland forest of northern KwaZulu-Natal.

== Description ==
A. machequena Smith (53 d) only differs from ranavalona in having the forewing at least in the male scaled with red-yellow to the apex of the cell and the upperside of the hindwing in the with yellowish instead of red scaling. Delagoa Bay, Nyassaland and Rhodesia The wingspan is 48–55 mm for males and 50–56 mm for females.

== Biology ==
Adults are on wing in late summer and autumn in South Africa and year-round in the rest of the range.

== Taxonomy ==
It is a member of the Acraea terpsicore species group - but see also Pierre & Bernaud, 2014

- Acraea (group ranavalona) machequena'; Henning, 1993, Metamorphosis 4 (1): 11
- Acraea (Acraea) (group neobule) machequena; Pierre & Bernaud, 2013, Butterflies of the World 39: 5, pl. 15, f. 6-7
- Acraea (Acraea) machequena; Henning & Williams, 2010, Metamorphosis 21 (1): 7;
