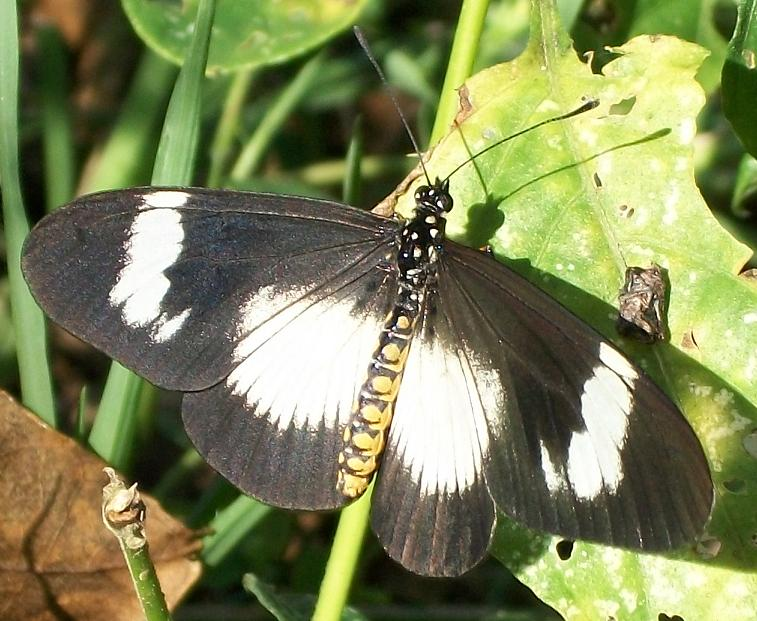
- Acraea esebria form monteironis
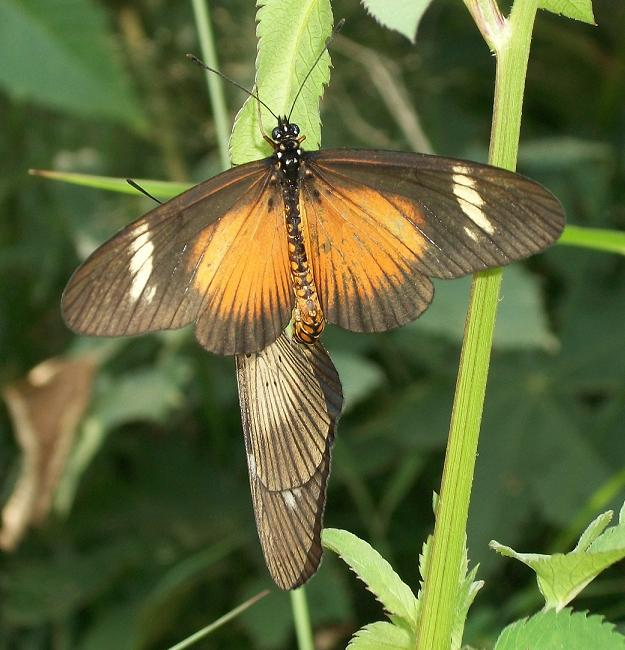
- Orange form male mating with female of another colour form

Scientific classification
- Kingdom: Animalia
- Phylum: Arthropoda
- Class: Insecta
- Order: Lepidoptera
- Family: Nymphalidae
- Genus: Acraea
- Species: A. esebria

Binomial name
- Acraea esebria Hewitson, 1861

Synonyms
- Telchinia esebria (Hewitson, 1861); Planema jacksoni Sharpe, 1890; Acraea (Actinote) esebria; Acraea protea Trimen, 1862; Planema metaprotea Butler, 1874; Planema monteironis Butler, 1874; Planema arctifascia Butler, 1874; Planema pseudoprotea Butler, 1874; Planema amphiprotea Butler, 1874; Planema jacksoni Sharpe, 1890; Acraea ertli Aurivillius, 1904; Acraea esebria f. nubilata Eltringham, 1912; Acraea jodutta f. inaureata Eltringham, 1912; Acraea esebria f. kibwezia Strand, 1913; Acraea esebria var. actinotis Neustetter, 1916; Acraea esebria f. swynnertoni O'Neal, 1919; Acraea esebria f. victoris Poulton, 1927; Acraea esebria f. flavibrunnea Stoneham, 1943; Acraea esebria f. pallidibrunnea Stoneham, 1943

= Acraea esebria =

Dusky acraea

Species of butterfly

Acraea esebria, the dusky acraea, is a butterfly of the family Nymphalidae from southern and eastern Africa.

== Description ==
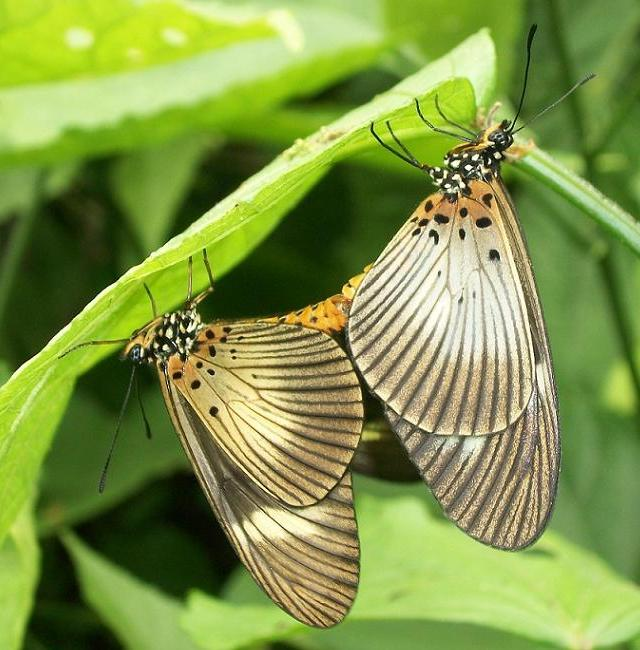
Side view of a mating pair

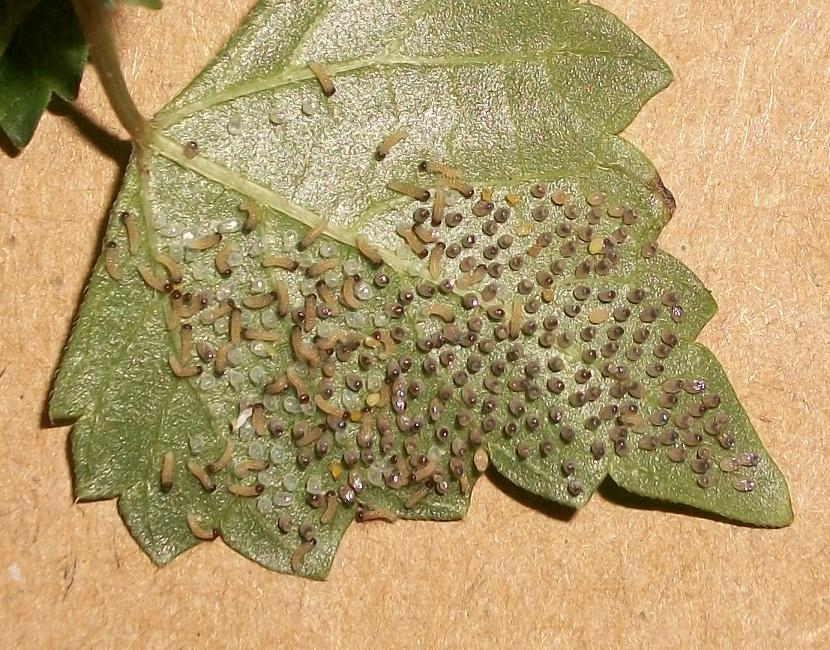
Eggs hatching on a Laportea peduncularis leaf

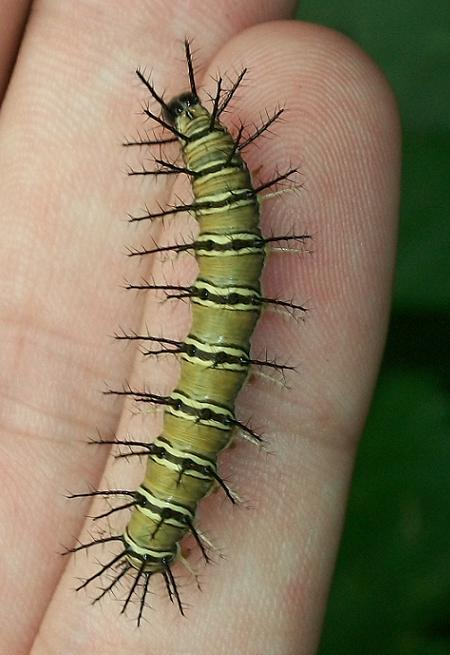
Larva on human finger

The wingspan is 45–55 mm for males and 53–60 mm for females. Males and females both show the same range of colouration. The dusky acraea is a variable species, but the most common form is black with a white band across the forewing and a white patch on the lower forewing and on the hindwing. There are a number of described morphs (with white, yellow or orange patches) including:

- f. ertli
- f. esebria
- f. protea (black with creamy-yellow patches)
- f. monteironis (black with white patches)
- f. jacksoni

== Description in Seitz ==
The numerous forms of A. esebria differ especially in the colour of the light markings, in the breadth of the subapical band and the hindmarginal spot of the forewing and in the development of the dark marginal band on the upperside of the hindwing. According to Trimen the larva is light ochre-brown; each segment in the middle with a black transverse streak edged with light yellow; head black; spines black, only the lateral spines on segments 5-11 yellow; lives on species of the genus Fleurya. Pupa white with slightly yellowish tone and fine black lines and small black spots; the first three segments of the abdomen with orange- yellow, black-bordered dorsal spots, in the middle of which is placed a small elevation; the points on the head short.

- esebria Hew. The hindmarginal spot of the forewing large and broad, almost reaching the base of cellules 1 a and 1 b and covering the base of cellule 2, brown-yellow; subapical band narrow, its spots in 5 and 6 shorter or at least not longer than the black basal part of these cellules, in the male light ochre-yellow or whitish yellow, in the female white. Hindwing brown-yellow above with a black marginal band about 4 mm. in breadth. Cape to the Congo and British East Africa.
- jacksoni E. Sharpe (57 d) is very similar to the type-form, only differing in having the subapical band of the forewing as dark as the hindmarginal spot and broader; in the female the subapical band is even broader and reaches vein 2, where it touches the hindmarginal spot; the breadth of the marginal band of the hindwing is very variable. Mashonaland to British East Africa.
- ab. ertli Auriv. closely approaches the form jacksoni, only differing materially in having the subapical band of the forewing still broader and white; the hindmarginal spot of the forewing and the ground-colour of the hindwing above are red-yellow in the female, light ochre-yellow in the male Usambara.
- f. pseudoprotea Btlr. closely approximates to the type-form, only differing in having the ground-colour of the hindwing above and the hindmarginal spot of the forewing lighter yellowish and the marginal band of the hindwing narrower. Angola.
- female-ab. amphiprotea Btlr. is also similar to the type-form, the only particular differences being that the dark marginal band on the upperside of the hindwing is not sharply defined proximally and the subapical band of the forewing is light brown-yellow like the other markings. Angola.
- female-f. metaprotea Btlr. The very broad subapical band and the large hindmarginal spot of the forewing touch in cellule 2 and are light brown-yellow; the hindwing is even lighter brown-yellow and has only a dark marginal line instead of the band; approximates to the form jacksoni. Angola.
- female-ab. nubilata Eltr. The darker areas are sepia black. The base of forewing cell, the inner-marginal patch, and the basal half of the hindwing are dark sepia grey. The forewing subapical band is greyish white. Zululand.

The three following forms differ from the preceding in the smaller and narrower hindmarginal spot of the forewing, which always leaves the base of cellules 1 a and 1 b free and also scarcely if at all covers the base of cellule 2.

- masaris Oberth. (57 c) [ this is now species Acraea masaris ] is on an average smaller than esebria; the light markings are red-yellow or brown-yellow in the male and white or light yellow in the female; the subapical band is scarcely broader than in the type-form. Comoro Islands and quite similar forms also in Usambara.
- protea Trim. (57 c) may be at once known by the small, not sharply defined hindmarginal spot of the forewing, which does not extend beyond vein 2; the subapical band of the forewing is narrow and its spots in cellules 4-6 are never longer than the black basal part of the cellules; the base of the hindwing above blackish, often as far as vein 2, and the marginal band of the hindwing broad; the light markings are light yellow in the male, light yellow or white in the female. Cape to Angola and British East Africa
- f. monteironis Btlr. (57 d) is similar to protea and like this has a small hindmarginal spot on the forewing, anteriorly bounded by vein 2; all the light markings are white, rarely light yellow; it differs from protea in the long, broad subapical band of the forewing which is about 6 mm. in breadth and has usually a spot in cellule 2 also. Angola, Mashonaland, German and British East Africa.

== Differences between A. esebria and A. jodutta ==
- A. esebria
  - The dark marginal band on the upperside of the hindwing broad and not sharply defined, long black rays extending far beyond it proximally; the subapical band of the forewing more

than 3.5 mm. in breadth.

- A. jodutta
  - The subapical band and the anteriorly broad hindmarginal spot of the fore wing nearly touch at a point on vein 3. A smaller species with a wing expanse of at most 50 mm.

== Distribution ==
This species is found from the Eastern Cape of South Africa to Zimbabwe and in Mozambique, Malawi, Zambia, southern Democratic Republic of the Congo (Shaba), Angola, Tanzania and eastern Kenya (east of the Rift Valley).

== Life cycle ==
=== Eggs ===
The eggs are oval in shape.

=== Larvae ===
The larvae feed on Urtica, Laportea peduncularis, Urera trinervis, Urera hypselodendron, Obetia tenax, Pouzolzia procridioides, Pouzolzia parasitica and Fleurya mitis.

=== Adults ===
Adults are on wing year round but are more common in the warmer months, from December to April. These butterflies fly slowly in and around forests and feed from flowers.

== Taxonomy ==
It is a member of the Acraea jodutta species group - but see also Pierre & Bernaud, 2014
