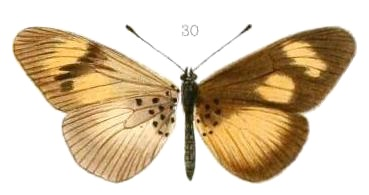
- Acraea masaris masaris

Scientific classification
- Kingdom: Animalia
- Phylum: Arthropoda
- Class: Insecta
- Order: Lepidoptera
- Family: Nymphalidae
- Genus: Acraea
- Species: A. masaris

Binomial name
- Acraea masaris Oberthür, 1893
- range

Synonyms
- Acraea (Actinote) masaris; Acraea esebria masaris

= Acraea masaris =

Species of butterfly

Acraea masaris is a butterfly in the family Nymphalidae. It is found on the Comoros.

== Subspecies ==
- Acraea masaris masaris (Comoros)
- Acraea masaris jodina Pierre, 1992 (Comoros)

== Similar species ==
- Acraea esebria

== Taxonomy ==
It is a member of the Acraea jodutta species group - but see also Pierre & Bernaud, 2014
