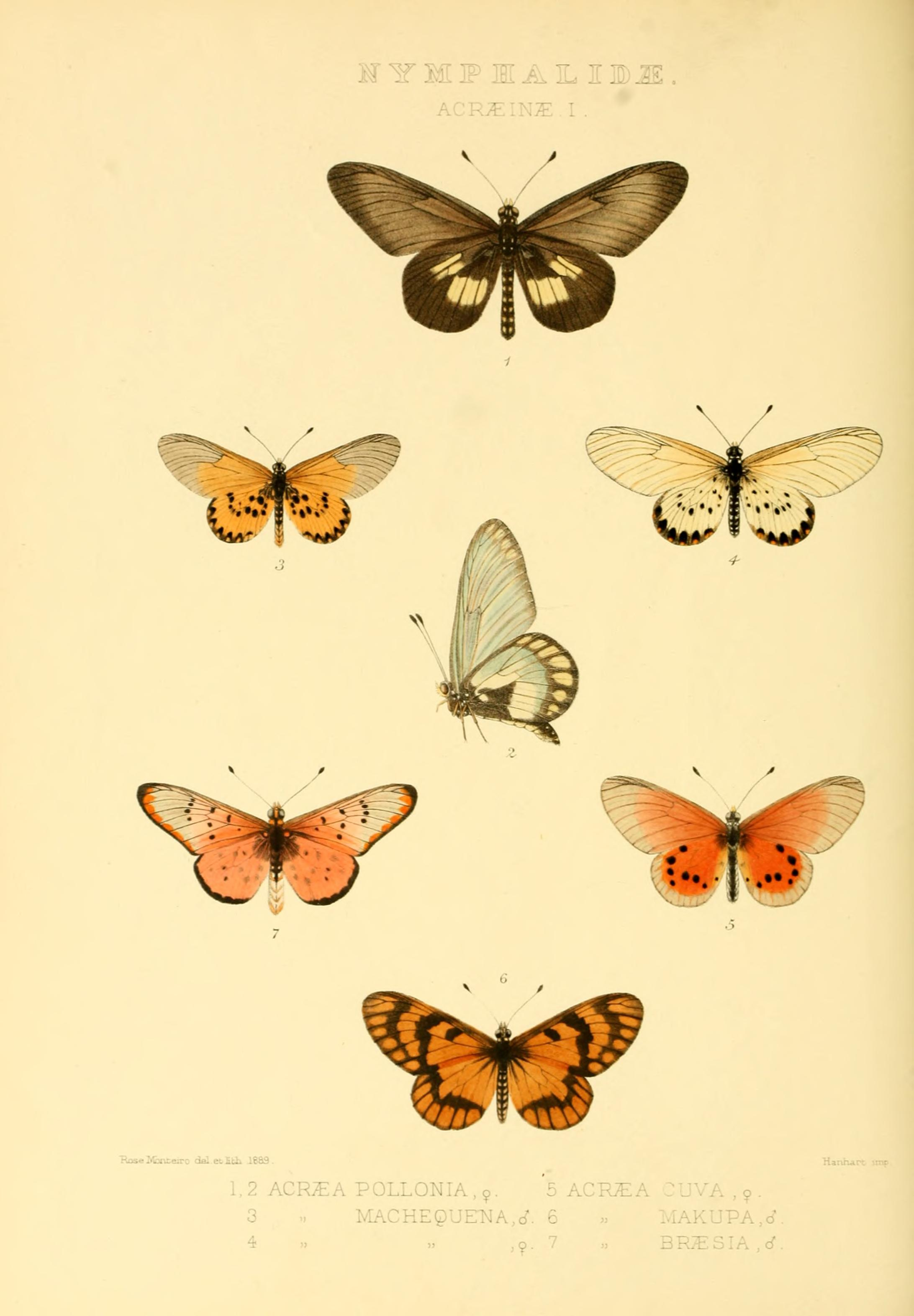
- Figure 5

Scientific classification
- Kingdom: Animalia
- Phylum: Arthropoda
- Class: Insecta
- Order: Lepidoptera
- Family: Nymphalidae
- Genus: Acraea
- Species: A. cuva

Binomial name
- Acraea cuva Grose-Smith, 1889

Synonyms
- Acraea (Acraea) cuva; Acraea dammi nidama Suffert, 1904

= Acraea cuva =

Species of butterfly

Acraea cuva, the chic acraea, is a butterfly in the family Nymphalidae. It is found along the coast of Kenya and Tanzania and in Malawi, Mozambique and eastern Zimbabwe.

== Description ==
Very similar to Acraea dammii qv. for diagnosis

== Biology ==
The habitat probably consists of forests.

Both sexes feed from the flowers of Lantana species.

== Taxonomy ==
It is a member of the Acraea terpsicore species group - but see also Pierre & Bernaud, 2014
