= Acraea comor =

Scientific classification
- Kingdom: Animalia
- Phylum: Arthropoda
- Class: Insecta
- Order: Lepidoptera
- Family: Nymphalidae
- Genus: Acraea
- Species: A. comor

Binomial name
- Acraea comor Pierre, 1992

Species of butterfly

Acraea comor is a butterfly in the family Nymphalidae. It is found on the Comoros.

== Taxonomy ==
It is a member of the Acraea jodutta species group - but see also Pierre & Bernaud, 2014
