= Acraea vuilloti =

- Acraea vuilloti and related species

Scientific classification
- Kingdom: Animalia
- Phylum: Arthropoda
- Clade: Pancrustacea
- Class: Insecta
- Order: Lepidoptera
- Family: Nymphalidae
- Genus: Acraea
- Species: A. vuilloti

Binomial name
- Acraea vuilloti Mabille, 1889

Synonyms
- Acraea (Actinote) vuilloti

Species of butterfly

Acraea vuilloti is a butterfly in the family Nymphalidae. It is found in Tanzania, from the eastern part of the country to Usambara, Uluguru, Usagara and Bagamayo.

== Description ==
A. vuilloti Mab. (56 d). Very close to Acraea pharsalus. The ground-colour of the forewing is often completely broken up into spots and the hindwing has a large white spot at the inner margin in cellules 1 b to 2 (to 3). Hindwing also beneath with dark marginal band. Marginal streaks thick, but not triangular. German East Africa.

== Taxonomy ==
It is a member of the Acraea pharsalus species group.
