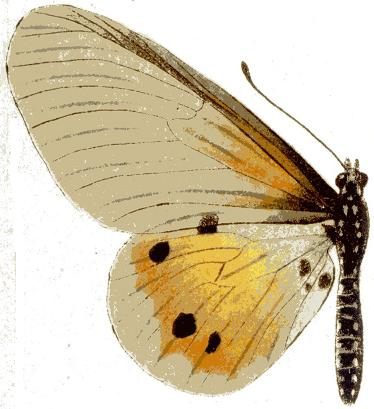
- Male
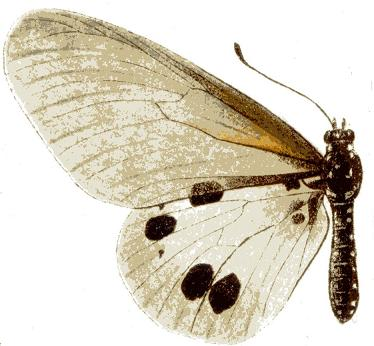
- Female

Scientific classification
- Kingdom: Animalia
- Phylum: Arthropoda
- Class: Insecta
- Order: Lepidoptera
- Family: Nymphalidae
- Genus: Acraea
- Species: A. dammii

Binomial name
- Acraea dammii van Vollenhoven, 1869

Synonyms
- Acraea (Acraea) dammii; Acraea percussa Keferstein, 1870; Acraea masonala Ward, 1872; Acraea villettei Oberthür, 1925

= Acraea dammii =

Species of butterfly

Acraea dammii is a butterfly in the family Nymphalidae. It is found on Madagascar and the Comoros.

== Description ==
A. dammii Vollenh. (53 b). Forewing to the apex of the cell and hindwing not or scarcely beyond the black spots scaled with red (male) or white (female); the hyaline marginal band of the hindwing is consequently broad, reaching the black spot in 3; the large black spot in 7 is placed much nearer to the base than the one in 6. Madagascar. - cuva Smith (57 a) [ now species Acraea cuva] differs in having the red (male) or dirty yellow (female) scaling on both wings extended much further distad; hence the hyaline marginal band of the hindwing is only about 2 mm. in breadth; hindwing usually with 6 to 8 discal dots, occasionally only with 5, ab. nidama Suff. [ = Acraea cuva ] German and British East Africa.

== Biology ==
The habitat consists of forests.

== Taxonomy ==
It is a member of the Acraea terpsicore species group- but see also Pierre & Bernaud, 2014
