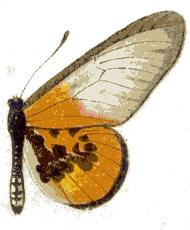

Scientific classification
- Kingdom: Animalia
- Phylum: Arthropoda
- Class: Insecta
- Order: Lepidoptera
- Family: Nymphalidae
- Genus: Acraea
- Species: A. lia

Binomial name
- Acraea lia Mabille, 1879

Synonyms
- Acraea (Actinote) lia

= Acraea lia =

Species of butterfly

Acraea lia is a butterfly in the family Nymphalidae. It is found on Madagascar and the Comoros (Mayotte, Anjouan).

== Description ==
A. lia Mab. (53 e) is very similar to the preceding species [Acraea admatha ] above, but smaller, with the marginal band of the hindwing narrow, only 1 mm. in breadth, without spots or only indistinctly spotted, and the discal dots placed nearer to the cell. Beneath the hindwing has white marginal spots and large red spots both at the proximal side of the marginal band and usually also between the discal and basal dots. Madagascar.

== Biology ==
The habitat consists of transformed grasslands.

== Taxonomy ==
It is a member of the Acraea pentapolis species group - but see also Pierre & Bernaud, 2014
