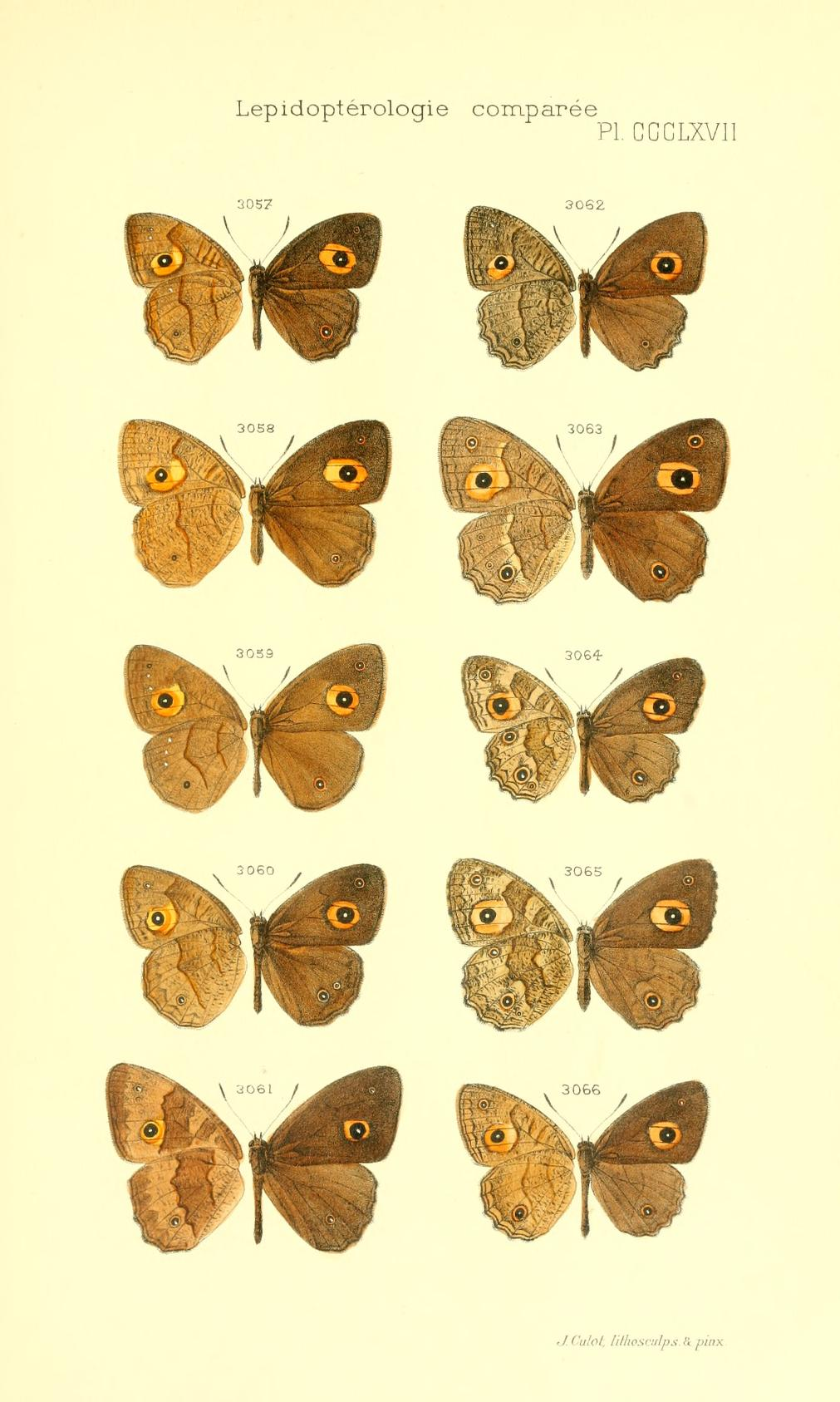
- Figure 3061 (male) in Oberthür's 1916 Lepidopterologie Comparie

Scientific classification
- Kingdom: Animalia
- Phylum: Arthropoda
- Clade: Pancrustacea
- Class: Insecta
- Order: Lepidoptera
- Family: Nymphalidae
- Genus: Heteropsis
- Species: H. comorana

Binomial name
- Heteropsis comorana (Oberthür, 1916)

Synonyms
- Culapa comorana Oberthür, 1916; Henotesia comorana; Culapa subrufa Turlin, 1994

= Heteropsis comorana =

Species of butterfly

Heteropsis comorana is a butterfly in the family Nymphalidae. It is found on the Comoro Islands (Grande Comore and Anjouan).

== Subspecies ==
- Heteropsis comorana comorana (Grand Comore)
- Heteropsis comorana subrufa (Turlin, 1994) (Anjouan)
