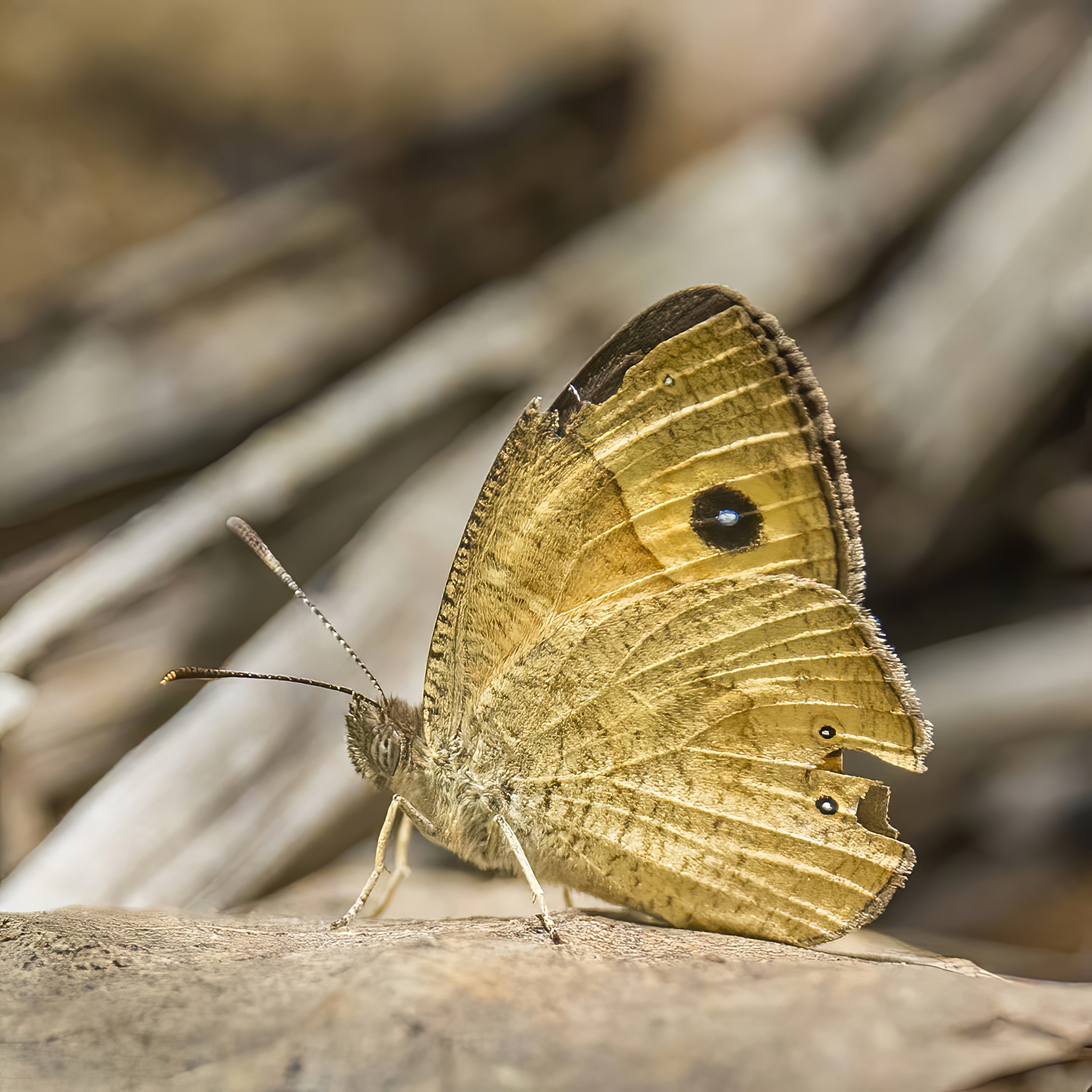
- Heteropsis narcissus narcissus, Mauritius

Scientific classification
- Kingdom: Animalia
- Phylum: Arthropoda
- Clade: Pancrustacea
- Class: Insecta
- Order: Lepidoptera
- Family: Nymphalidae
- Genus: Heteropsis
- Species: H. narcissus

Binomial name
- Heteropsis narcissus (Fabricius, 1798)

Synonyms
- Papilio narcissus Fabricius, 1798; Henotesia narcissus; Mycalesis fraterna Butler, 1868; Mycalesis evanescens Saalmüller, 1884; Culapa borbonica Oberthür, 1916; Henotesia borbonica; Culapa comorensis Oberthür, 1916; Henotesia comorensis; Culapa mayottensis Oberthür, 1916; Henotesia mayottensis

= Heteropsis narcissus =

Species of butterfly

Heteropsis narcissus is a butterfly in the family Nymphalidae. It is found on Madagascar, Mauritius, Réunion and the Comoros. The habitat consists of forest margins, orchids, unnatural grasslands and anthropogenic environments.

The larvae feed on Poaceae species, including Bambusa species.

== Subspecies ==
- Heteropsis narcissus narcissus (Mauritius, Reunion)
- Heteropsis narcissus fraterna (Butler, 1868) (Madagascar, Anjouan)
- Heteropsis narcissus borbonica (Oberthür, 1916) (Reunion)
- Heteropsis narcissus comorensis (Oberthür, 1916) (Anjouan and Moheli)
- Heteropsis narcissus salimi (Turlin, 1994) (Grand Comore)
- Heteropsis narcissus mayottensis (Oberthür, 1916) (Comoro Islands)
