= Wildlife of the Comoros =

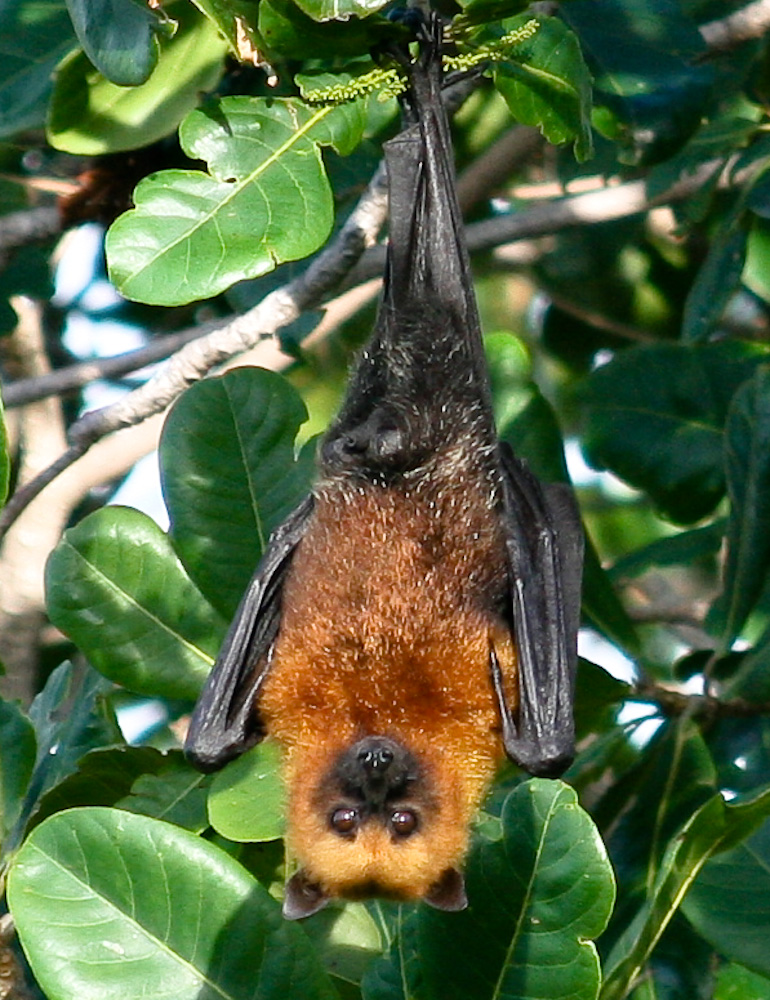
Seychelles fruit bat

The wildlife of the Comoro Islands is composed of their flora and fauna.

== Fauna ==
=== Mammals ===
The mammalian diversity of the Comoros, like most other young volcanic islands, is restricted to marine mammals and bats.

== Flora ==
The country is home to 72 species of orchids.
