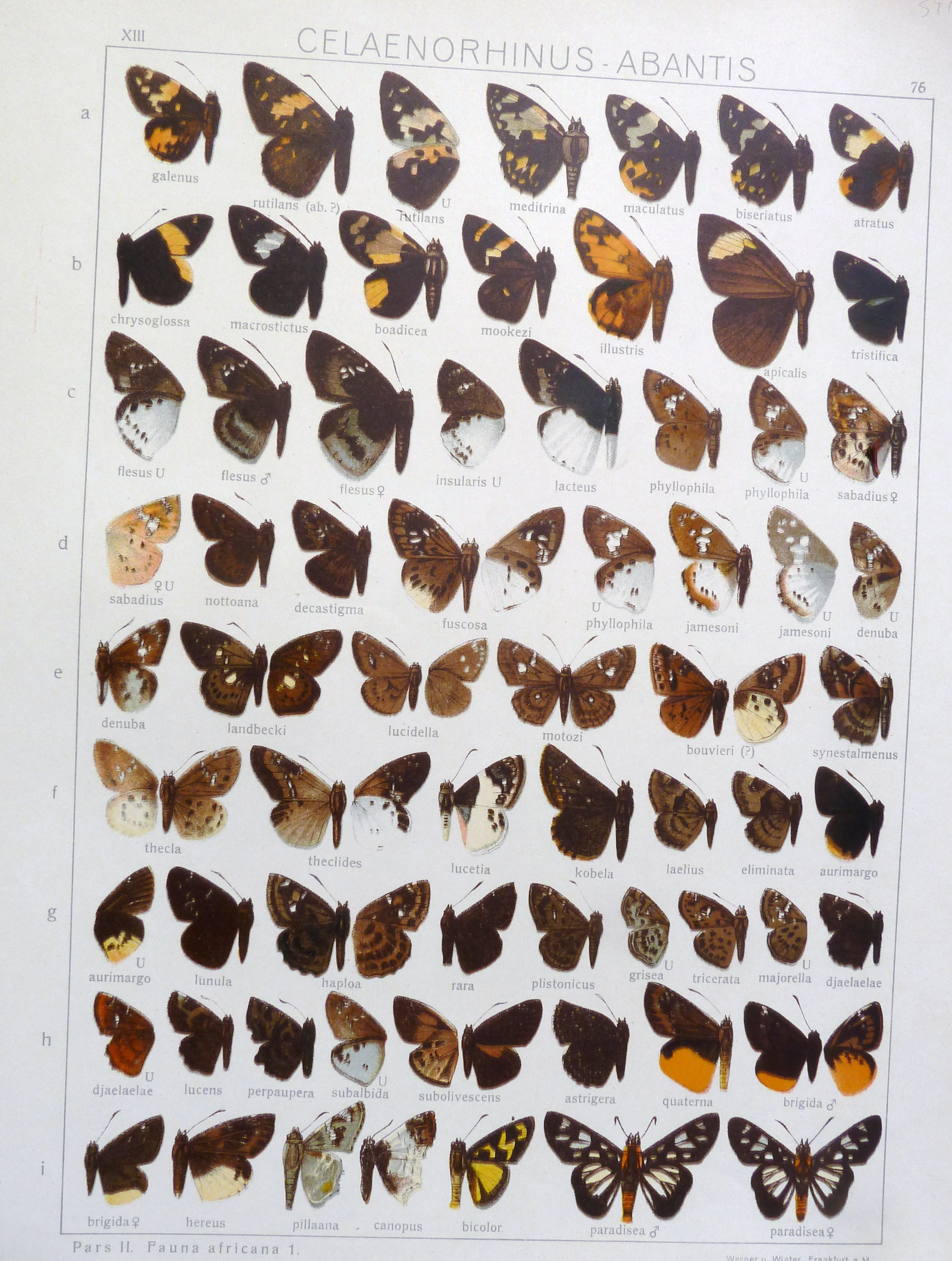

Scientific classification
- Kingdom: Animalia
- Phylum: Arthropoda
- Class: Insecta
- Order: Lepidoptera
- Family: Hesperiidae
- Genus: Tagiades
- Species: T. insularis

Binomial name
- Tagiades insularis Mabille, 1876

= Tagiades insularis =

Species of butterfly

Tagiades insularis is a butterfly in the family Hesperiidae. It is found on Madagascar and the Comoro Islands. The habitat consists of forests, forest margins and anthropogenic environments.

== Subspecies ==
- Tagiades insularis insularis (Madagascar)
- Tagiades insularis grandis Evans, 1937 (Comoro Islands: Grand Comore, Moheli and Anjouan)
- Tagiades insularis mayotta Evans, 1937 (Comoro Islands: Mayotte)
