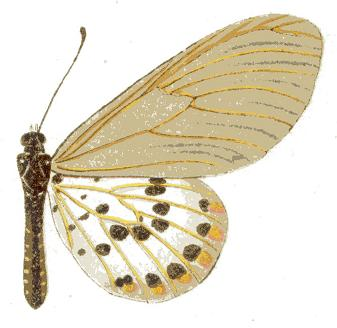
- Female
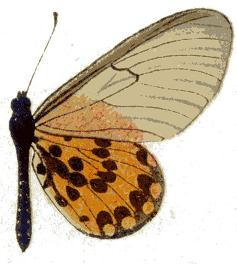
- Male

Scientific classification
- Kingdom: Animalia
- Phylum: Arthropoda
- Class: Insecta
- Order: Lepidoptera
- Family: Nymphalidae
- Genus: Acraea
- Species: A. ranavalona

Binomial name
- Acraea ranavalona Boisduval, 1833

Synonyms
- Acraea (Acraea) ranavalona; Acraea maransetra Ward, 1872; Acraea manandaza Ward, 1872

= Acraea ranavalona =

Species of butterfly

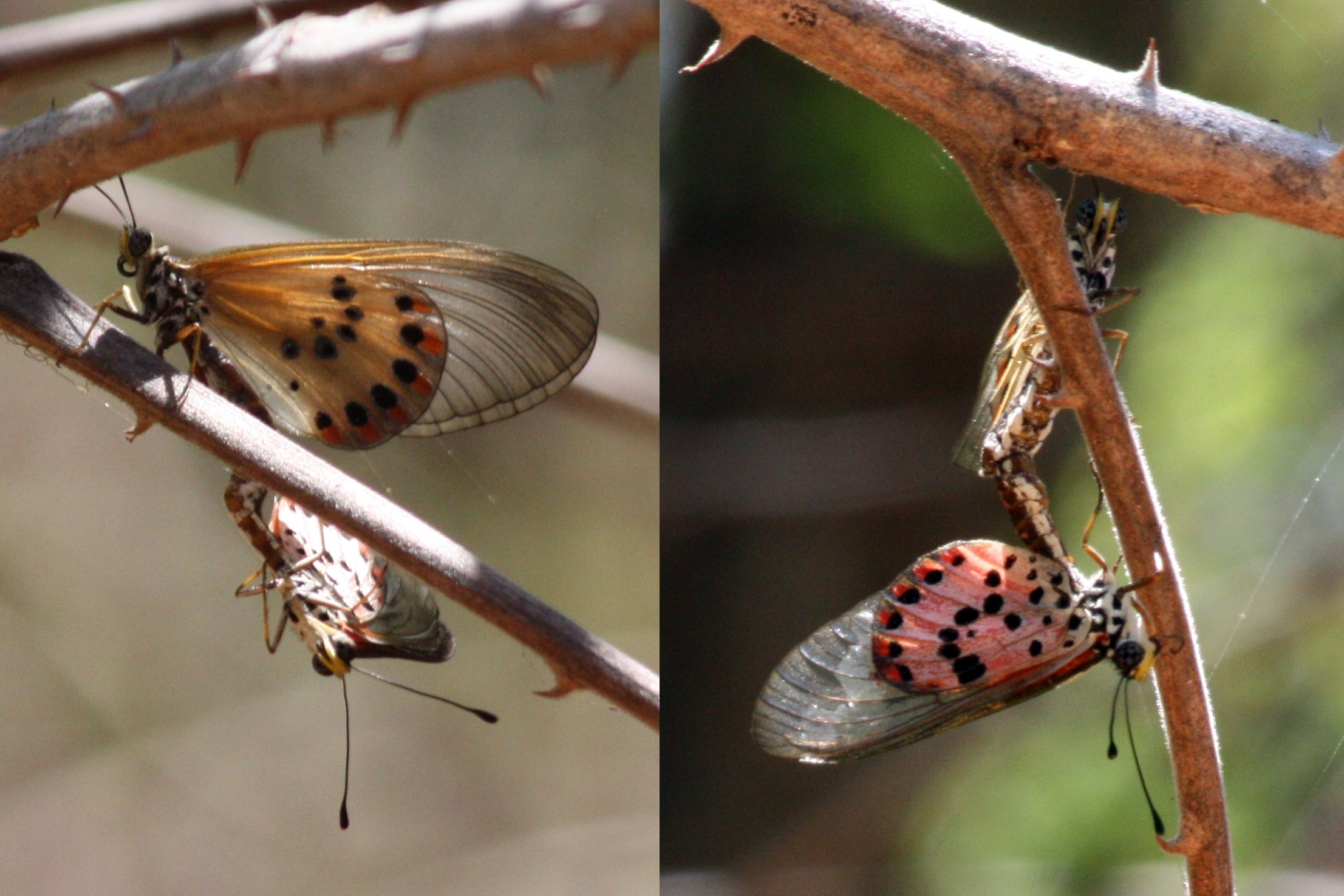
Acraea ranavalona butterflies mating, Anjajavy Forest, Madagascar

Acraea ranavalona is a butterfly in the family Nymphalidae. It is found on Madagascar and the Comoros.

== Description ==
A. ranavalona Bdv. (53 c, d). Forewing at the base as far as vein 2 bright red (male) or almost completely hyaline (female); hindwing with grey, often semitransparent, red-spotted marginal band, the red marginal spots proximally bounded by sharply defined black submarginal dots; basal and discal dots distinct; ground-colour beneath white, above in the male bright red, in the female white or whitish. Madagascar and Comoros. Female aberratio form manandaza Ward (53 d). Ground-colour of the hindwing more or less reddish. Madagascar. Aberratio form maransetra Ward. The discal dots of the hindwing united into a transverse band. Madagascar.

== Biology ==
The habitat consists of forests. The colours in life may be much brighter than those shown in early collections and in museums.

== Taxonomy ==
It is a member of the Acraea terpsicore species group - but see also Pierre & Bernaud, 2014

- Acraea (group ranavalona) ranavalona; Henning, 1993, Metamorphosis 4 (1): 11
- Acraea (Acraea) (group neobule) ranavalona; Pierre & Bernaud, 2013, Butterflies of the World 39: 5, pl. 15, f. 8-10
