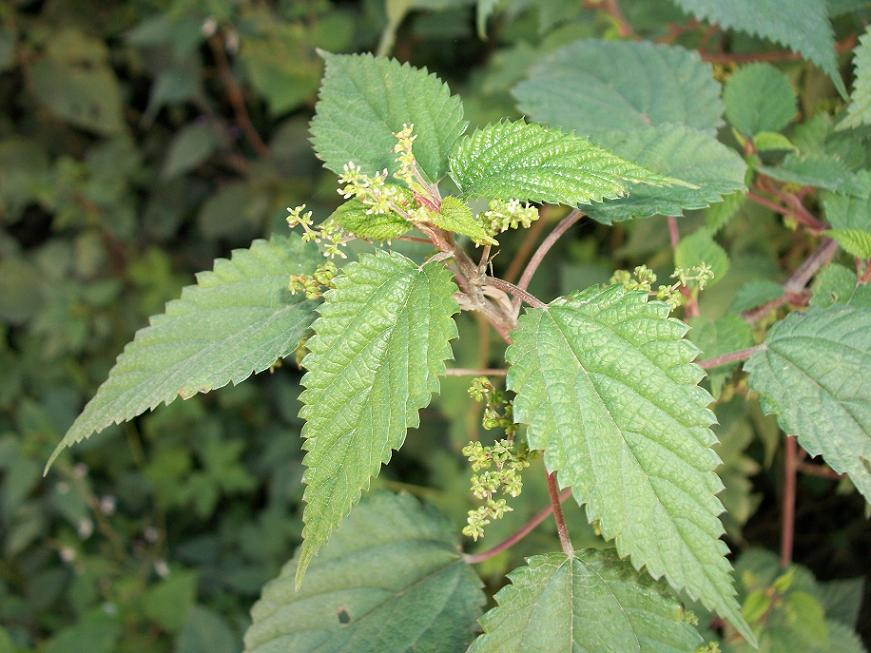
- Laportea peduncularis from Karkloof area, KwaZulu-Natal, South Africa
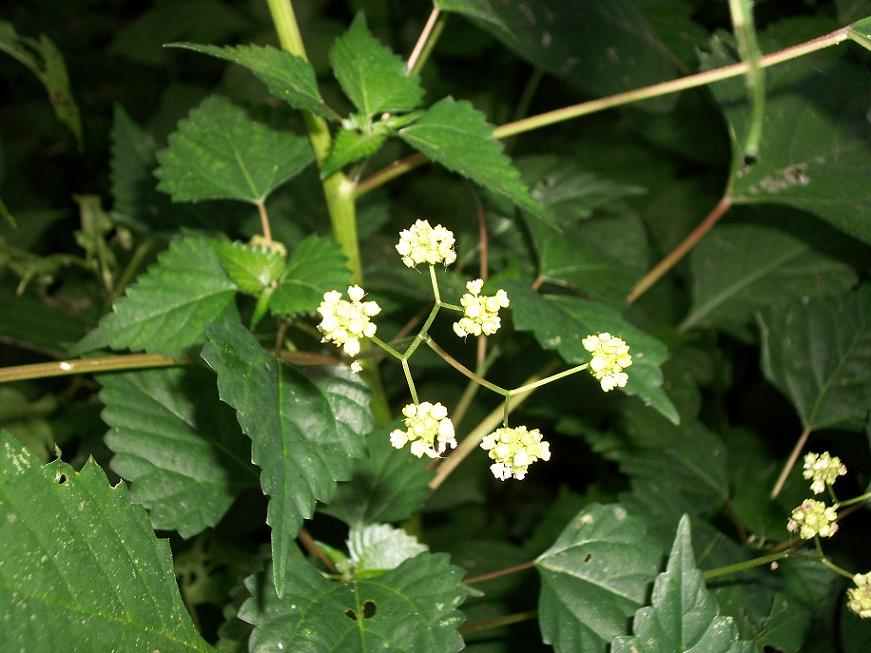
- Laportea peduncularis latidens from Athlone Park, Amanzimtoti, South Africa

Scientific classification
- Kingdom: Plantae
- Clade: Tracheophytes
- Clade: Angiosperms
- Clade: Eudicots
- Clade: Rosids
- Order: Rosales
- Family: Urticaceae
- Genus: Laportea
- Species: L. peduncularis

Binomial name
- Laportea peduncularis (Wedd.) Chew

= Laportea peduncularis =

Species of flowering plant

Laportea peduncularis, the river nettle, is a herbaceous plant in the family Urticaceae. It is consumed for its anti-inflammatory effects.
