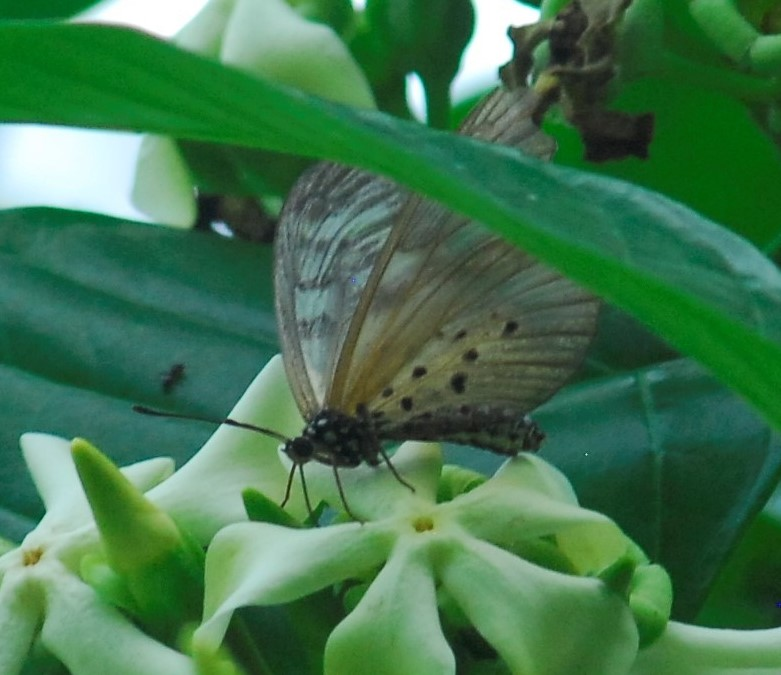

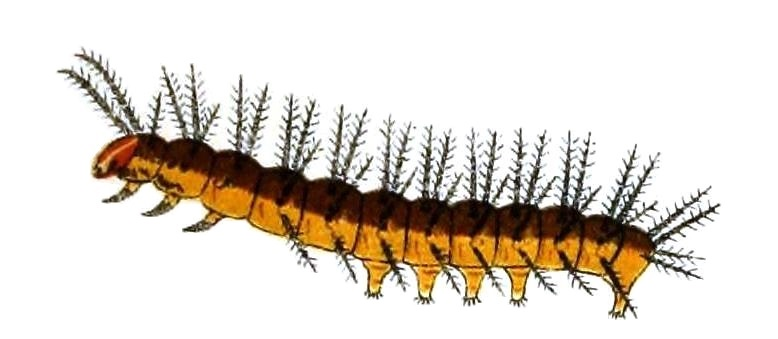
- Imago in coastal Cameroon, and larva illustrated in Eltringham (1912)

Scientific classification
- Kingdom: Animalia
- Phylum: Arthropoda
- Class: Insecta
- Order: Lepidoptera
- Family: Nymphalidae
- Genus: Acraea
- Species: A. pentapolis

Binomial name
- Acraea pentapolis Ward, 1871

Synonyms
- Acraea thelestis Oberthür, 1893; Acraea epidica Oberthür, 1893

= Acraea pentapolis =

Scarce tree-top acraea

Species of butterfly

Acraea pentapolis, also known as the scarce tree-top acraea or eastern musanga acraea, is a butterfly in the family Nymphalidae. It is found in western and central Africa.

== Habitat and food ==
The habitat consists of forests, and the larvae feed on Myrianthus holstii (Urticaceae).

== Description ==
In 1912, Harry Eltringham wrote:

Male. Expanse 60–76 mm. Wings semitransparent, due to absence of scales. Head black with a few whitish dots and two tufts on collar, thorax black with whitish marks, abdomen black above with whitish segmental lines and lateral spots. Claws unequal. Female like the male and presenting the same variations of pattern.
Forewing costa, apex, and hind margin powdered with brownish. Several ill-defined dusky marks varying much in intensity but usually consisting of the following. A broad irregular mark in cell over origin of 2, a blackish mark on discocellulars, a series of rudimentary marks beyond cell in the form of an oblique discal band of spots in 6, 5, 4, and 3, a mark at base of area 2 and beneath it running downwards and outwards a mark in lb. In the same area a short indistinct longitudinal streak at base.
Hindwing with a dusky powdering round hind margin, and more or less evident darker internervular rays showing their greatest development in 2, 1c, and 1b. Lower half of cell, base of 3, basal half of 2, and the greater part of 1c, 1b, and 1a covered with scales which vary in colour from pale lemon-ochreous to brick red. In some cases this patch is very fully developed and of definite outline, whilst in others it is merely indicated. Numerous black spots corresponding to those on underside but varying much in size and number.
Underside. Forewing almost devoid of scales, hindwing as above but the yellow or red patch paler and less developed. Black spots very variable in number. In the case of maximum development the following may be observed. A spot in 9, a subbasal and a central (very small) in 7, one at extreme base of 5, and a double spot at base of 4, two in cell before middle, three or four discal spots progressively larger in size, in 6, 5, 4, and 3, a large spot at base of 2 followed by a spot in 1c and lb, these three nearly in a straight line, but that in 1c slightly nearer base. A basal and a subbasal in spot in 1c, ditto in 1b, and a basal and two other spots in 1a.

== Description in Seitz ==
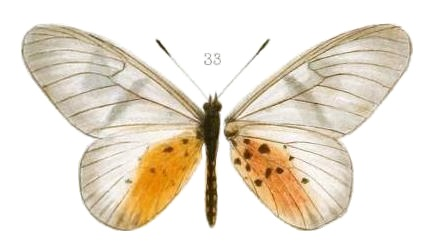
Acraea pentapolis pentapolis,
male from Gabon

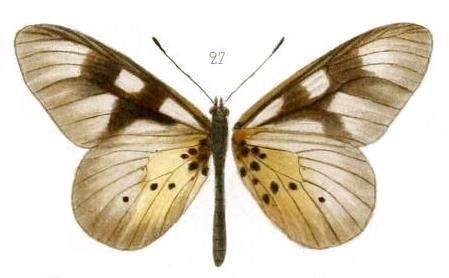
Acraea pentapolis epidica,
male from Usambara Mts near Pangani, Tanzania

A. pentapolis has the hindwing hyaline or transparent at the costal margin, in cellules 5 to 7 as far as the cell and in lc to 4 at the distal margin; thus only the cell, cellules 1a to 2 nearly to the distal margin and the base of cellule 3 (and 4) are scaled; the marginal streaks are often only distinct in cellules 1c to 3. Larva dark umber-brown above with a white spot at each side on segments 4 to 12; head red-brown. Spines black, the one on segment 2 elongated. Pupa whitish with black markings; abdomen dorsally with short, obtuse elevations.

- pentapolis Ward (56 e). Transverse band of the fore wing dull and little distinct; scaling of the hind wing very thin, pale yellow to whitish. Sierra Leone to the Congo and Uganda, aberratio form thelestis Oberth. (56 f). Scaling of the hindwing red-yellow. Among the type-form.
- epidica Oberth. (56 f). Transverse band of the forewing deep black and sharply defined, often much widened; scaling of the hindwing lemon-yellow; distal margin of both wings often broadly darkened. German East Africa.

== Subspecies ==
- Acraea pentapolis pentapolis — Cameroon, Gabon, Angola, Democratic Republic of the Congo, Uganda, western Kenya
- Acraea pentapolis epidica Oberthür, 1893 — Tanzania, Malawi, Mozambique, eastern Zimbabwe

== Taxonomy ==
It is a member of the Acraea pentapolis species group.- but see also Pierre & Bernaud, 2014
