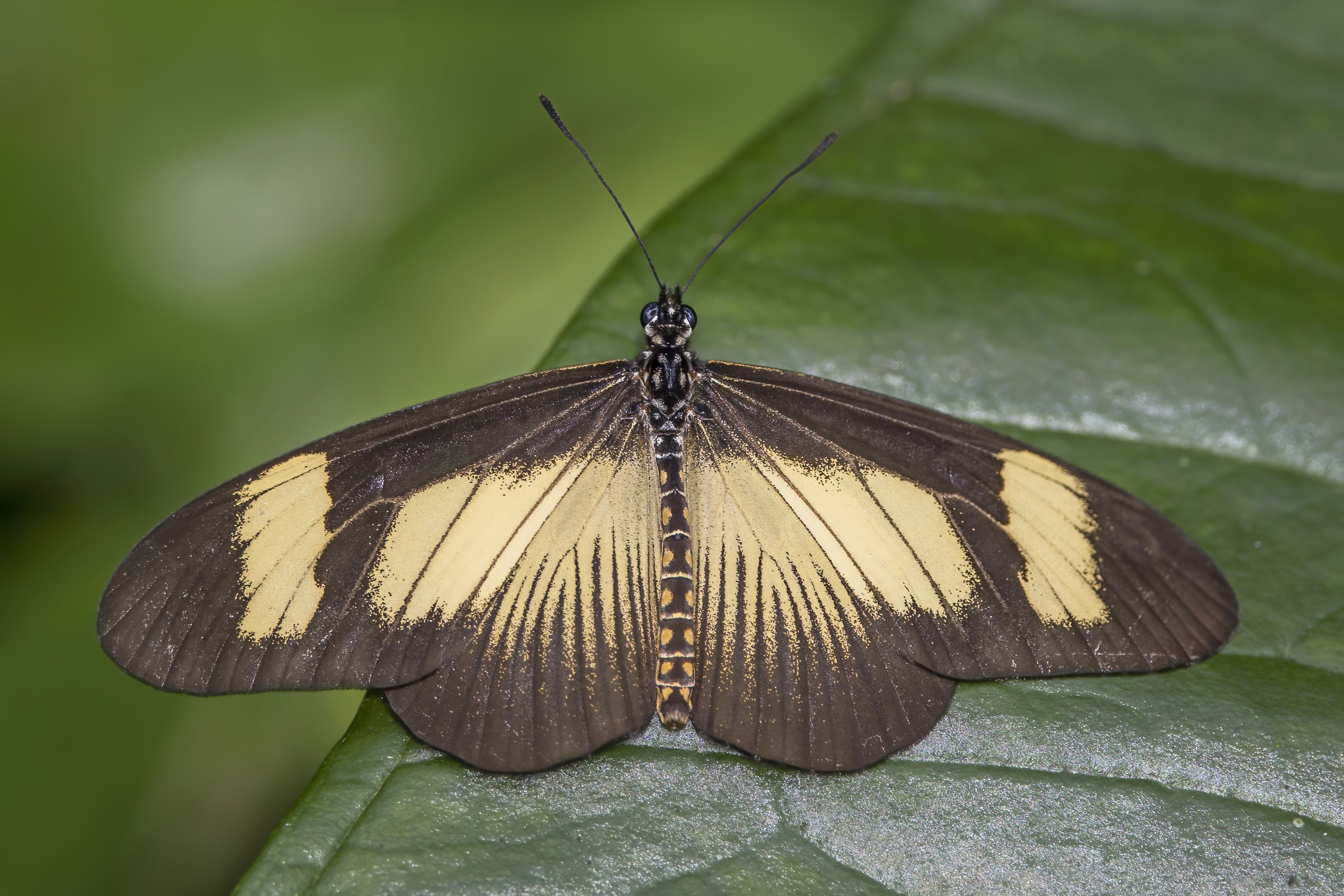

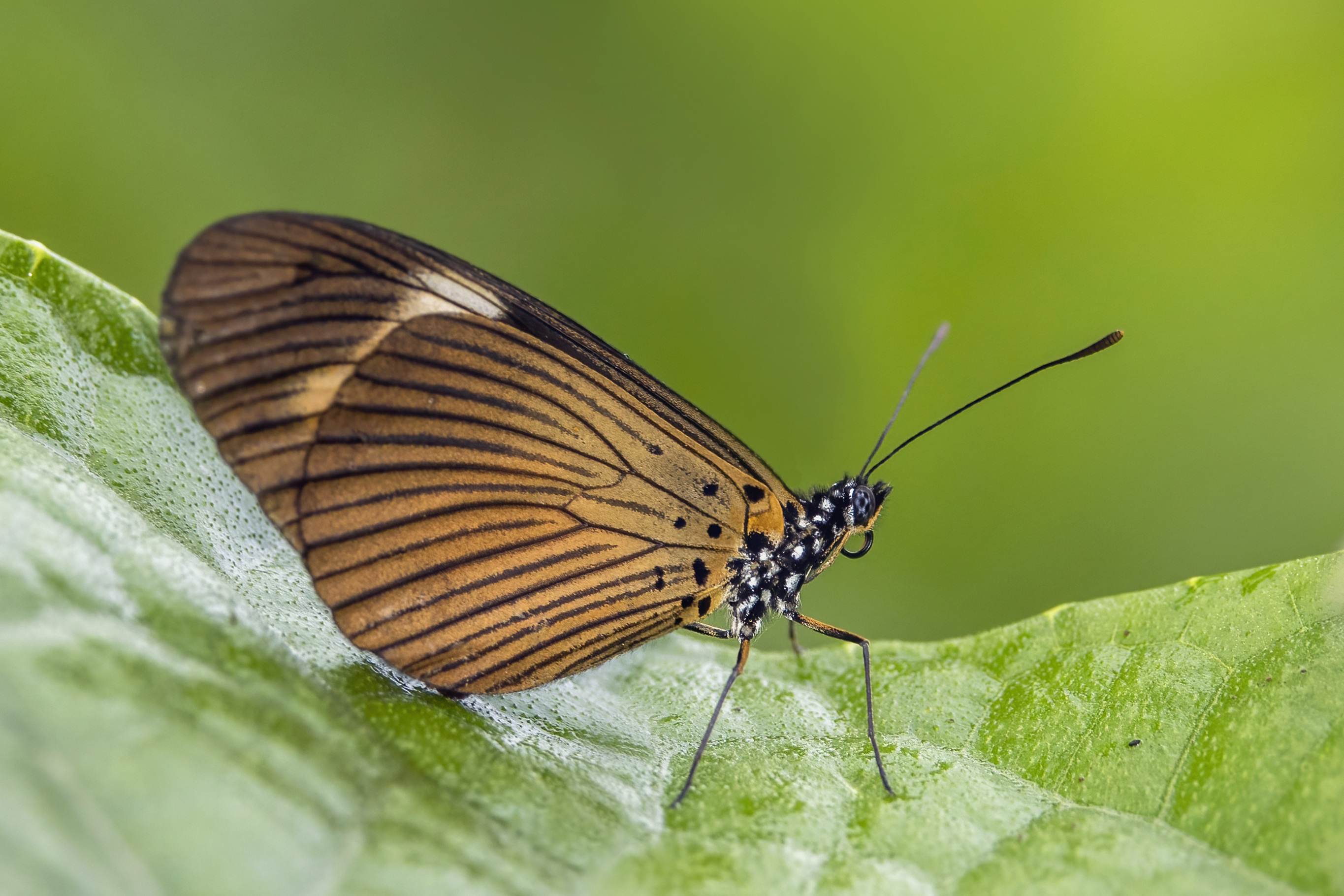
- both males São Tomé and Príncipe

Scientific classification
- Kingdom: Animalia
- Phylum: Arthropoda
- Clade: Pancrustacea
- Class: Insecta
- Order: Lepidoptera
- Family: Nymphalidae
- Genus: Acraea
- Species: A. jodutta

Binomial name
- Acraea jodutta (Fabricius, 1793)

Synonyms
- Papilio jodutta Fabricius, 1793; Acraea (Actinote) jodutta; Acraea carmentis Doubleday, 1847; Acraea flava Dewitz, 1879; Planema dorotheae Sharpe, 1902; Acraea jodutta f. interjecta Eltringham, 1912; Acraea jodutta f. subfulva Eltringham, 1912; Acraea jodutta f. castanea Eltringham, 1912; Acraea jodutta f. joduttana Strand, 1914; Acraea jodutta ab. integra Schultze, 1923; Acraea jodutta ab. clara Ungemach, 1932

= Acraea jodutta =

Species of butterfly

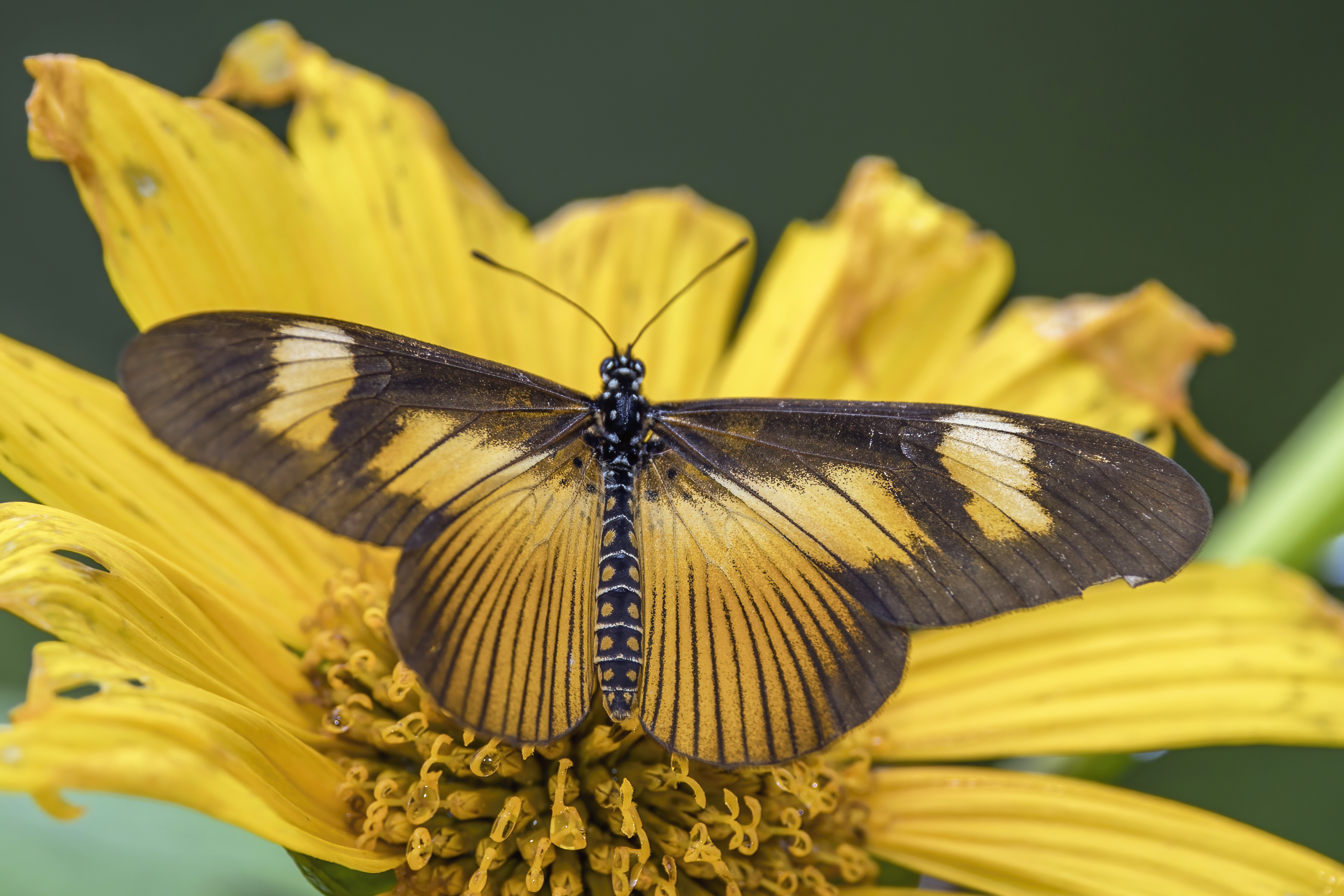
female

Acraea jodutta, the jodutta acraea, is a species of butterfly in the family Nymphalidae. It is found in Guinea, Sierra Leone, Liberia, Ivory Coast, Ghana, Togo, Nigeria, Cameroon, Equatorial Guinea, São Tomé and Príncipe, Gabon, the Republic of the Congo, the Central African Republic, Angola, the Democratic Republic of the Congo, Sudan, Uganda, Kenya and Ethiopia.

== Description ==
A. jodutta F. (57 e). Wings above black-brown; the forewing as in esebria with a light subapical band, which is always broad and has a spot in 3, and a sharply defined hindmarginal spot about 6 mm. in breadth, reaching vein 3 but leaving the base of cellules 1 a and 1 b free; the hindmarginal spot is continued on the hindwing as a median band of equal breadth or somewhat widened; the light markings are dull light-yellow in the male, pure white in the female. Senegal to the Cameroons. ab. carmentis Dbl. and Hew. (57 e) only differs from the female of the type-form in the subapical band of the fore wing having a spot in cellule 2 also so that it is merely separated from the hindmarginal spot by a fine line of the ground-colour. Among the type-form. - female -ab. dorotheae E. Sharpe (57 d as pseudoprotea and metaprotea). The subapical band of the fore wing is orange-yellow to whitish; the hindwing and the hindmarginal spot of the fore wing are orange- yellow; the former has thick black streaks on the folds and its marginal band is only developed in the anterior part and even there only 2-3 mm. in breadth. Uganda and British East Africa. - female-ab. interjecta Eltr. The subapical band of the forewing white; the hindmarginal spot of the forewing only indicated by light ochre-yellow scales except in la, where it is sharply defined; a white longitudinal streak in 2 near the distal margin; basal half of the hindwing light ochre-yellow, distal half suffused with red-brown and at the apex blackish. British East Africa. -female-ab. subfulva Eltr. only differs from the typical female in having the distal half of the hindwing above red-brown and only at the distal margin more or less blackish. Sierra Leone.-female-ab. castanea Eltr. (59 a). The subapical band of the fore wing indistinct, dark grey; hindmarginal spot yellow-brown; hindwing above chestnut-brown with narrow black marginal band only 3 mm. in breadth and narrowed towards the anal angle, beneath dark brown-grey, at the base reddish. Lagos. female -ab. inaureata Eltr. (57 d, as amphiprotea; 59 d).[Acraea jodutta f. inaureata Eltringham, 1912 ] Wings bright brown-yellow at the base of the cell, in l a and 1 b nearly to the distal margin and at the base of cellule 2; subapical band white; hindwing above bright brown-yellow, not darkened at the base and without dark marginal band, at the distal margin with distally thickened black longitudinal streaks. Nyassaland. - aethiops Rothsch. and Jord. is the Abyssinian race and differs in the male in having the hindmarginal spot of the forewing broader, so that at the hindmargin it is only 3 mm. from the base, while the cell has a nebulous spot and the black parts of the hindwing are narrower. In the female the subapical band is white or orange-yellow, the hindmarginal spot large and orange-yellow and the upperside of the hind wing almost entirely orange-yellow, the black rays in the posterior part indistinct.

== Differences between A. jodutta and A.esebria ==
- A. jodutta
  - The subapical band and the anteriorly broad hindmarginal spot of the fore wing nearly touch at a point on vein 3. A smaller species with a wing expanse of at most 50 mm.
- A. esebria
  - The dark marginal band on the upperside of the hindwing broad and not sharply defined, long black rays extending far beyond it proximally; the subapical band of the forewing more than 3.5 mm. in breadth.

== Biology ==
The habitat consists of forests. The larvae feed on Fleurya, Urera, Pouzolzia and Boehmeria species.

== Subspecies ==
- Acraea jodutta jodutta (Guinea, Sierra Leone, Liberia, Ivory Coast, Ghana, Togo, Nigeria, Cameroon, Bioko, São Tomé and Príncipe, Gabon, Congo, Central African Republic, Angola, Democratic Republic of the Congo, southern Sudan, Uganda, western Kenya, Zambia)
- Acraea jodutta aethiops Rothschild & Jordan, 1905 (Ethiopia)

Torben Larsen developed a species numbering system for his 2005 publication Butterflies of West Africa. The nominate subspecies is #1157. The 'Larsen' numbers have since been used with permission in A Sharp Eye on Butterflies of Ghana.

== Similar species ==
- Acraea disjuncta

== Taxonomy ==
It is a member of the Acraea jodutta species group. See also Pierre & Bernaud, 2014.
