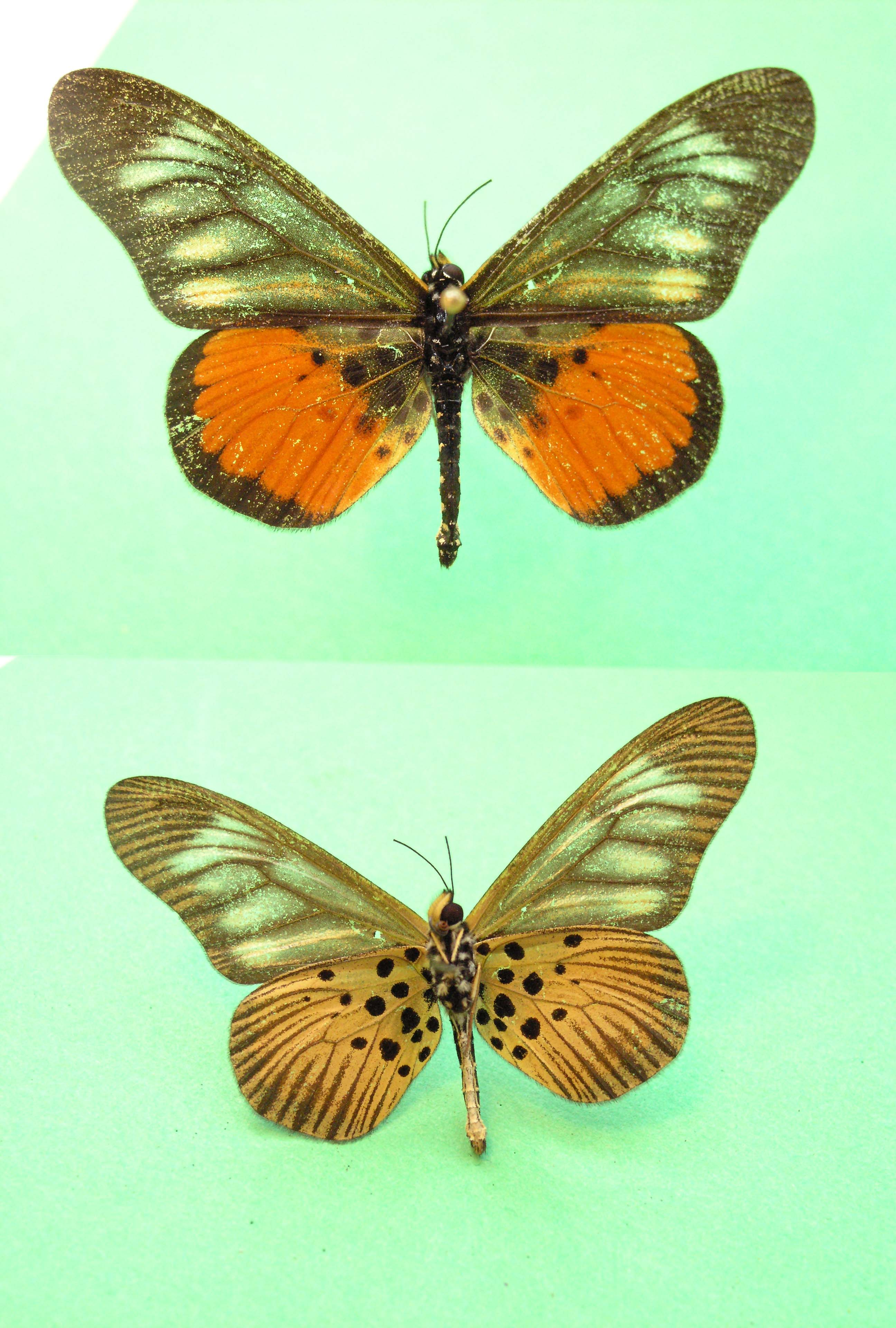

Scientific classification
- Kingdom: Animalia
- Phylum: Arthropoda
- Class: Insecta
- Order: Lepidoptera
- Family: Nymphalidae
- Genus: Acraea
- Species: A. pelopeia

Binomial name
- Acraea pelopeia Staudinger, 1896

Synonyms
- Acraea (Actinote) pelopeia; Acraea peneleos f. pelopeia Staudinger, 1896; Acraea tropicalis Blachier, 1912; Acraea pelopeia var. lineata Aurivillius, 1925

= Acraea pelopeia =

Species of butterfly

Acraea pelopeia is a species of butterfly in the family Nymphalidae. It is found from Cameroon to the eastern part of the Democratic Republic of the Congo and in the Central African Republic.

== Description ==
Male. Wingspan 68 mm. Forewing sepia black. Cell, basal portions of 6, 5, 4, 3, 2, and nearly all lb, rather thinly scaled and partially transparent. A slight submarginal powdering of whitish scales in lb. Hindwing with a dark sepia-grey basal suffusion extending slightly beyond origin of nervule 2, and outwardly approximately determined by a line drawn from middle of costa to middle of inner margin. Discal area deep orange red (probably rosy red when alive), A well-defined brown-black hind-marginal border about 2 mm. wide, its inner edge slightly edentate (lacking teeth) on the nervules. Black spots as beneath, but obscured by basal suffusion. Underside. Costa, apical area and hind margin dusky ochreous, striated by the nervules and rays which are broadly powdered with dark brown. The ochreous marginal border gradually obscured towards the hind angle by a sepia-brown suffusion. A black spot at base of costa, and some black at base of area 1b.

Hindwing Basal area and hind margin greenish ochreous, central area ochreous. The brown nervures towards the margin heavily dusted with dark brown, the dusting being widest before it reaches the margin, thus giving the nervules a swollen appearance. Between them the internervular rays, though more slender, are similarly indicated. Unlike peneleos these rays extend to the bases of the internervular areas. A series of black spots, most of which are rather large. In area 7, two, much closer together than in peneleos. Beneath the outer spot a smaller one more distally placed in area 6, and beneath this a dot in 5. On the upper part of discocellulars a spot of variable size, sometimes continent with another just beneath it. In cell two or three spots, the second over origin of nervule 2, and the third, when present, very small. Sometimes a spot at base of area 3. A spot in 2 near its base, followed by one in 1c and in lb, nearly in a straight line. A basal and a subbasal in 1c. Beneath the latter a spot in lb, and more proximally placed a spot in la. A spot in 9 and in 8.

Head black with a pale dot between eyes, two pale tufts on collar. Thorax black above with two pale spots. Abdomen black above with yellowish lateral spots. Claws unequal. The female was not described.

The late Dr. Otto Staudinger in his 1896 paper in Iris, gave a description of this species. This description is somewhat involved, and consists largely of a comparison of penelope, peneleos, parrhasia, and the present form. He concludes by saying that, should it be found through the acquisition of further material to be a distinct species, he proposes for it the name pelopeia. After having seen the insect described,

I found it agreed in all respects with two males in the Tring collection. I cannot claim to have certainly established its specific distinction, but at present at least I propose to keep it separate from peneleos which it closely resembles. The peculiar appearance of the nervules on the hindwing underside scarcely suffices to distinguish it from some examples of peneleos which exhibit a similar tendency. On the other hand, the internervular rays in all forms of peneleos are comparatively short, whilst in this species they extend to the bases of their respective areas. The whole insect is of a larger and stouter build. The two spots in area 7 of the hindwing are closer together than in peneleos, whilst finally, though the male armature is, like that of several allied forms, simple in structure and but little distinctive, it appears to present certain constant differences. The acquisition of a female specimen may help to decide its true affinity. In the meantime I prefer to keep the form separate from peneleos, under the name which the late Dr. Staudinger proposed. That author's example is described as from the Upper Congo, without precise locality. One of the Tring examples is labelled Aruwimi, and the other Luebo, Kassai River. These localities are rather far apart, the latter being apparently some 750 miles S.W. of the former. The two examples do not, however, appear to differ in any noticeable particular. In addition to these two specimens there are also in the Tring collection several examples taken near Ft. Beni in the northern part of the Congo region. These I must refer to the same species. They differ only in having a browner ground-colour, and in the hindwing a duller shade of red.

== Taxonomy ==
It is a member of the Acraea circeis species group - but see also Pierre & Bernaud, 2014
