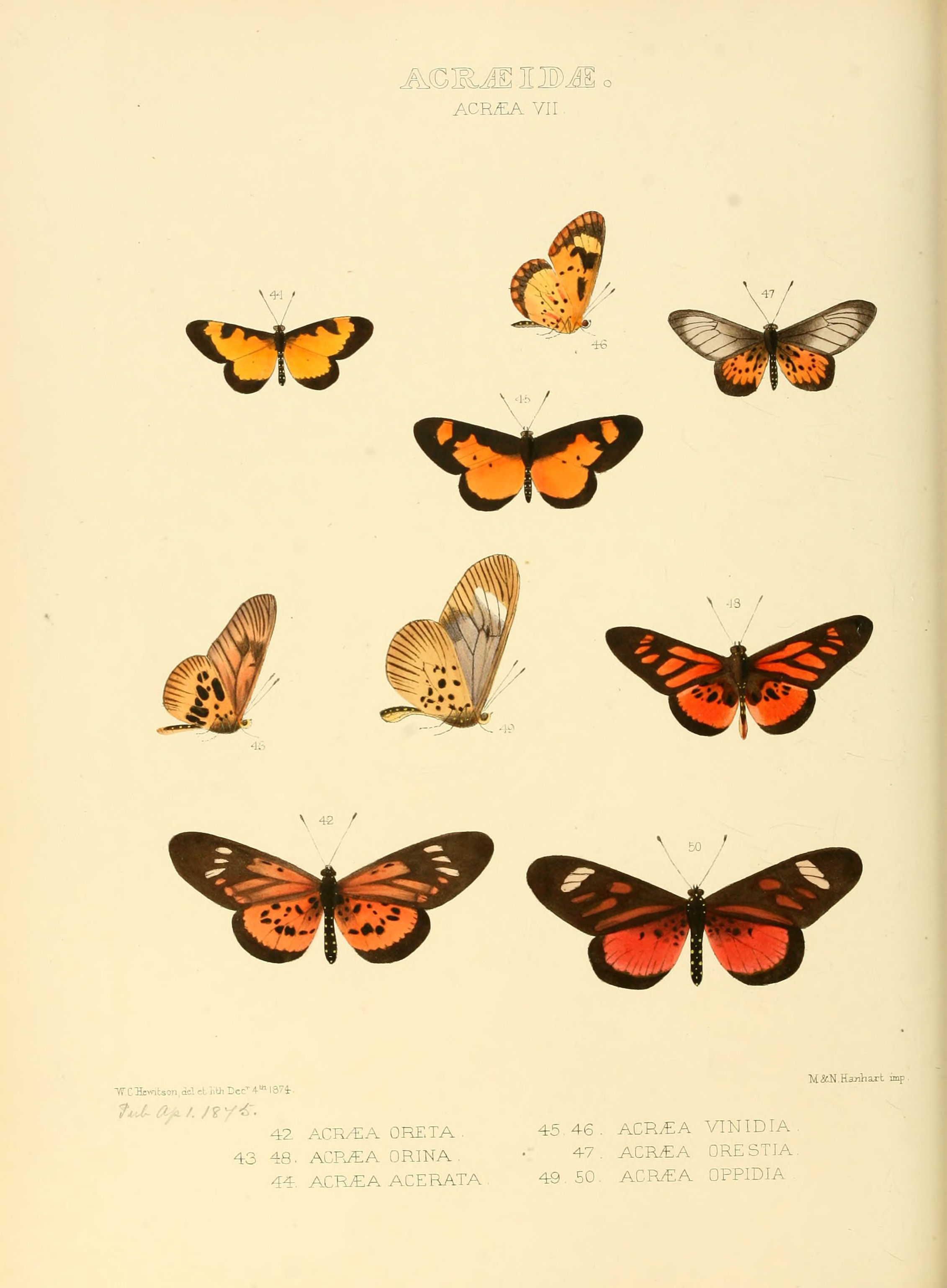
- Figures 43 and 48

Scientific classification
- Kingdom: Animalia
- Phylum: Arthropoda
- Clade: Pancrustacea
- Class: Insecta
- Order: Lepidoptera
- Family: Nymphalidae
- Genus: Acraea
- Species: A. orina

Binomial name
- Acraea orina Hewitson, 1874

Synonyms
- Acraea (Actinote) orina; Acraea oreta Hewitson, 1874; Acraea orina var. nigroapicalis Aurivillius, 1893

= Acraea orina =

Orina acraea

Species of butterfly

Acraea orina, the orina acraea, is a butterfly in the family Nymphalidae. It is found in Ivory Coast, Ghana, Togo, Nigeria, western Cameroon and Equatorial Guinea (Mbini and Bioko).

== Description ==
A. orina. This species differs from the nearly allied parrhasia in having the forewing fully scaled, with sharply defined red markings. Fore wing black above with a long red stripe in the cell and in 1 b and red discal spots in 2-6 or at least in 2. Hindwing black above with broad red median band, which only covers the extreme apex of the cell, or in the female red to the base with black dots. Under surface of the fore wing to beyond the middle reddish, then yellowish, with black veins and thick black streaks; hindwing with yellow ground colour, large black dots in the basal area and thick black streaks on the interneural folds. - orina Hew. (= orinata Oberth. 57 a). Forewing with red (male, female) or white (female) discal spots in cellules 3–6. Sierra Leone to the Congo. - f. nigroapicalis Auriv. Forewing without light spots in cellules 3–6. Cameroons to Uganda (57 a); orina is a transitional form with red spot only in 3. - orineta Eltr. [ Acraea orinata ] is the eastern race and is characterized by having the red markings of the forewing more extended and the basal area on the hindwing above black in the female also; the light spots in cellules 4-6 of the forewing in the female are sometimes whitish, sometimes red as in the male. Uganda, as aberration also in West Africa.

Torben Larsen developed a species numbering system for his 2005 publication Butterflies of West Africa. This species is #1150. The 'Larsen' numbers have since been used with permission in A Sharp Eye on Butterflies of Ghana.

== Biology ==
The habitat consists of forest clearings and edges.

Adults males mud puddle and both sexes are attracted to flowers.

== Taxonomy ==
It is a member of the Acraea circeis species group - but see also Pierre & Bernaud, 2014
