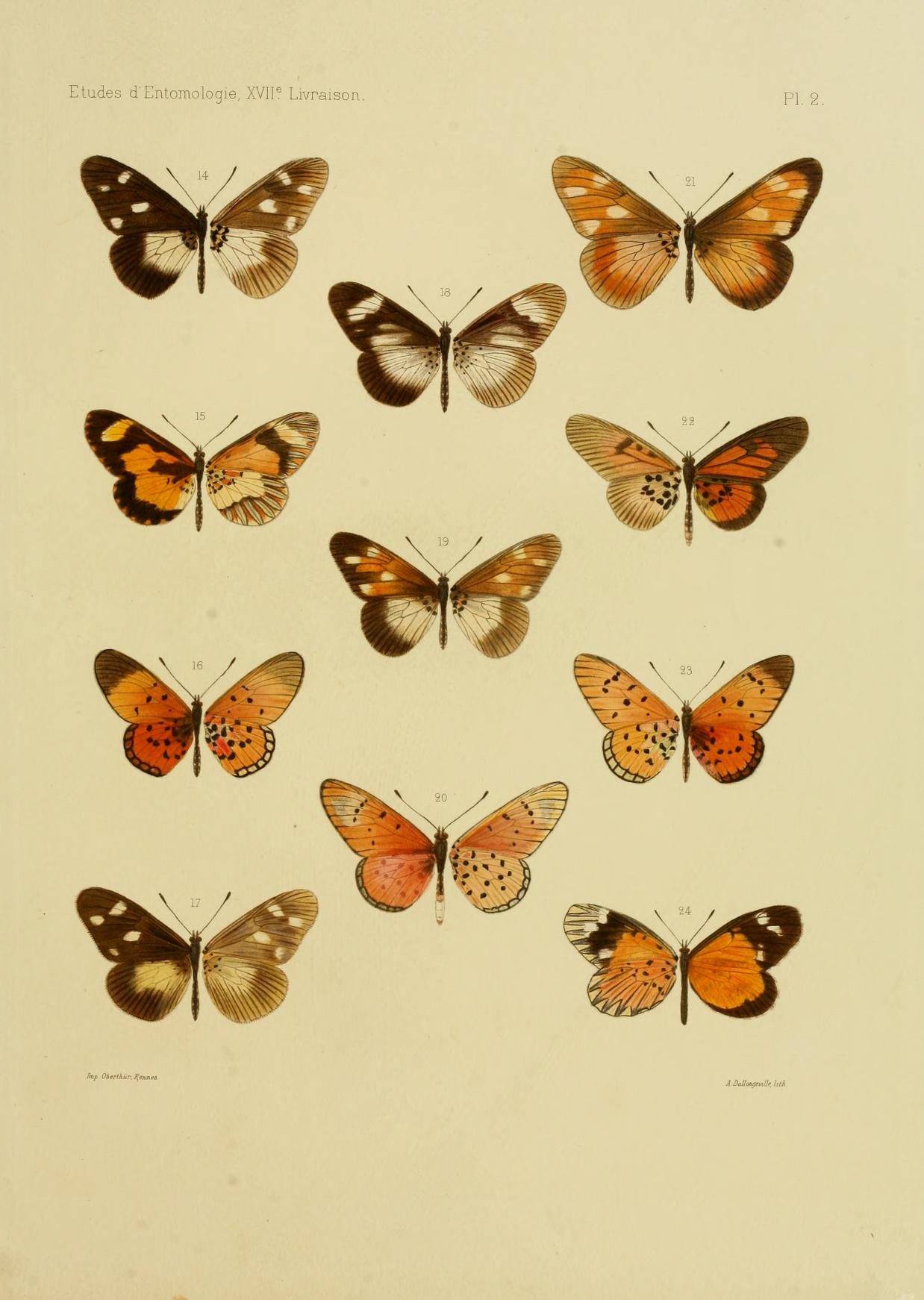
- Figure 22

Scientific classification
- Kingdom: Animalia
- Phylum: Arthropoda
- Class: Insecta
- Order: Lepidoptera
- Family: Nymphalidae
- Genus: Acraea
- Species: A. orinata

Binomial name
- Acraea orinata Oberthür, 1893

Synonyms
- Acraea (Actinote) orinata; Acraea orina orineta Eltringham, 1912

= Acraea orinata =

Species of butterfly

Acraea orinata is a butterfly in the family Nymphalidae. It is found from Cameroon to the Democratic Republic of the Congo and in the Central African Republic, Rwanda, Uganda, Ethiopia and north-western Tanzania.

== Description ==
Very close to Acraea orina q.v.

== Taxonomy ==
It is a member of the Acraea circeis species group - but see also Pierre & Bernaud, 2014
