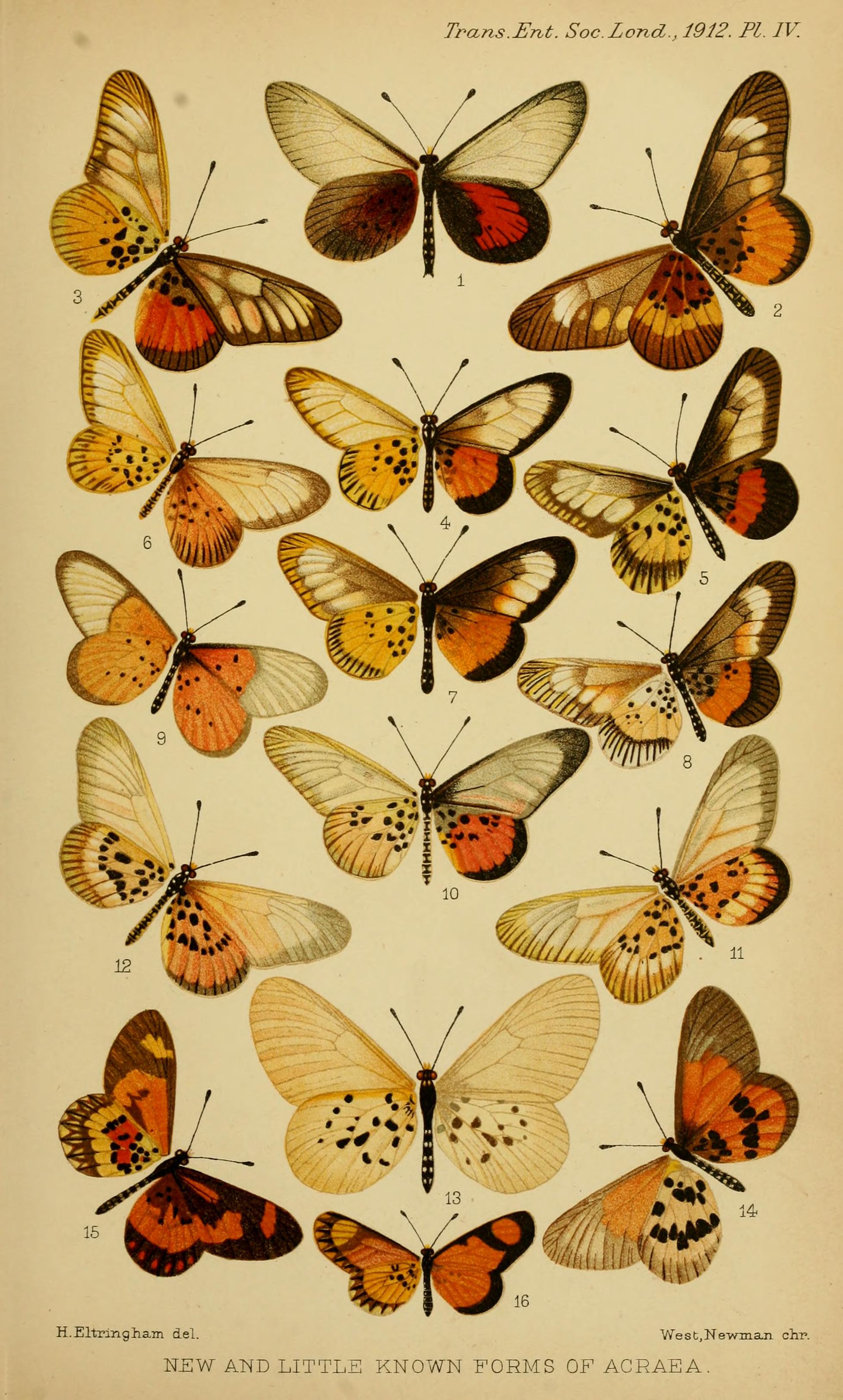
- A. p. translucida male figure 4, A. p. derubescens figure 5, A. p. translucida female figure 6, A. p. vitrea figure 7

Scientific classification
- Kingdom: Animalia
- Phylum: Arthropoda
- Clade: Pancrustacea
- Class: Insecta
- Order: Lepidoptera
- Family: Nymphalidae
- Genus: Acraea
- Species: A. penelope

Binomial name
- Acraea penelope Staudinger, 1896

Synonyms
- Acraea (Actinote) penelope; Acraea penelope f. argentea Eltringham, 1912; Acraea penelope f. exalbescens Eltringham, 1912; Acraea penelope f. penella Eltringham, 1912; Acraea penelope ab. sulphurescens Aurivillius, 1913; Acraea penelope f. laeticolor Le Doux, 1928; Acraea penelope penelope f. josetta Jackson, 1951

= Acraea penelope =

Species of butterfly

Acraea penelope, the Penelope acraea or Penelope's acraea, is a butterfly in the family Nymphalidae. It is found in Nigeria, Cameroon, the Republic of the Congo, the Democratic Republic of the Congo, Uganda, Kenya and Tanzania. The habitat consists of sub-montane forests.

== Description ==
A. penelope differs from the very similar species in the abbreviated streaks on the underside of the hindwing, which do not reach the distal margin; the cell of the forewing is sometimes unicolorous dark without spots, sometimes more or less diaphanous; the forewing in 1-6 with light or transparent spots, which are often united into a transverse band; the hindwing above at the base broadly darkened (occasionally in the females very slightly) and then with a red or red-yellow (occasionally light yellow) median band and broad black marginal band. The under surface of the hindwing is light coloured, usually yellowish, and has in the basal part the usual dots, 2 in cellule 7 and 1-3 in the cell. The species is very variable and the forms intergrade without any sharp dividing-line. - penelope Stgr. (57 b). Wings thickly scaled, ground-colour black; the spots in cellules 1-3 of the forewing small, free, rounded, red or reddish, the one in 3 often absent; those in cellules 4-6 are also small and form a sharply defined, whitish transparent subapical band; hindwing with narrow red median band, beneath light yellow with thick black streaks proximally often united on the veins. Specimens in which spots 1 b and 2 are larger, lighter and more or less transparent constitute transitions to the following forms. Congo and Uganda. - female -ab. argentea Eltr. Spots transparent and continuous, forming a transverse band, which, however, does not entirely cover the base of cellules 3-6; those in cellules 1 b and 2 proximally tinged with reddish; median band of the hindwing red-yellow, about 5 mm. in breadth; dark marginal band of the upper surface with distinct black longitudinal streaks; under surface except in the middle with silver-grey ground-colour. Uganda.- female -ab. exalbescens Eltr. resembles the type-form in pattern, but all the red markings are replaced by yellowish white and the marginal band on the upper surface is as broad as in argentea, 3–4 mm. Ground-colour of the under surface yellowish white. Uganda. -female ab. sulphurescens ab. nov. closely approaches the preceding form; spots 1 b and 2 of the forewing elongate-rounded, thinly scaled with yellowish, 3-6 diaphanous; median band of the hindwing above about 5 mm. in breadth, of exactly the same colour as in servona; under surface coloured quite as in servona. Very like a small A. servona; but the cell of the fore wing without light spot and the marginal streaks on the under surface abbreviated and distally pointed as in penelope. Uganda: Sesse Islands. female -ab. penella Eltr. Forewing above at the base reddish almost to the apex of the cell, then with a hyaline median band about 5 mm. in breadth, which, however, does not cover the base of cellules 4-6, so that there is a blackish spot at the end of the cell: marginal band black-brown, about 2 mm. in breadth. Hindwing above only narrowly darkened at the base and with narrow marginal band, only 2 mm. in breadth, the red-yellow median band consequently much widened, in the middle about 10mm. in breadth; hindwing beneath strongly suffused with reddish in the basal half and with much lighter median band. Uganda. - vitrea Eltr. Fore wing above black with sharply defined diaphanous transverse band about 4 mm. in breadth, which does not fully reach the base of cellules 2-6 and is tinged with reddish in 1 a and at the proximal side of the spots in 1 b and 2; the hindwing with red-yellow median band about 7 mm. in breadth and black marginal band about 2 mm.; under surface as in the type-form with the ground-colour light yellow. British East Africa. - derubescens Eltr. (57 b; as peneleos). Forewing above almost as in vitrea, the diaphanous spots, however, often reaching the base of cellules 2-6; hindwing with bright red median band, only 4.5 mm. in breadth, and black marginal band 5 mm. in breadth, hindwing beneath light greenish at the base and the distal margin, light yellow in the middle. Togoland. translucida. - translucida Eltr. (60 a) differs from the other forms in having the forewing diaphanous and only at the margins and the base narrowly blackish (male) or dark grey (female); hindwing in the almost as in the type-form, but with red-yellow median band 7 mm. in breadth, in the female very little darkened at the base and with grey marginal band, not sharply defined, hence almost the entire upper surface light reddish yellow. Lagos.

== Subspecies ==
- A. p. penelope (eastern Nigeria, Cameroon, Congo, Democratic Republic of the Congo, Uganda, western Tanzania)
- A. p. derubescens Eltringham, 1912
- A. p. vitrea Eltringham, 1912 (Kenya: highlands west of the Rift Valley)

Torben Larsen developed a species numbering system for his 2005 publication Butterflies of West Africa. The subspecies derubescens is #1145. The 'Larsen' numbers have since been used with permission in A Sharp Eye on Butterflies of Ghana.

== Taxonomy ==
It is a member of the Acraea circeis species group.

== Etymology ==
Named in the Classical tradition Penelope is a character in Homer's Odyssey.
