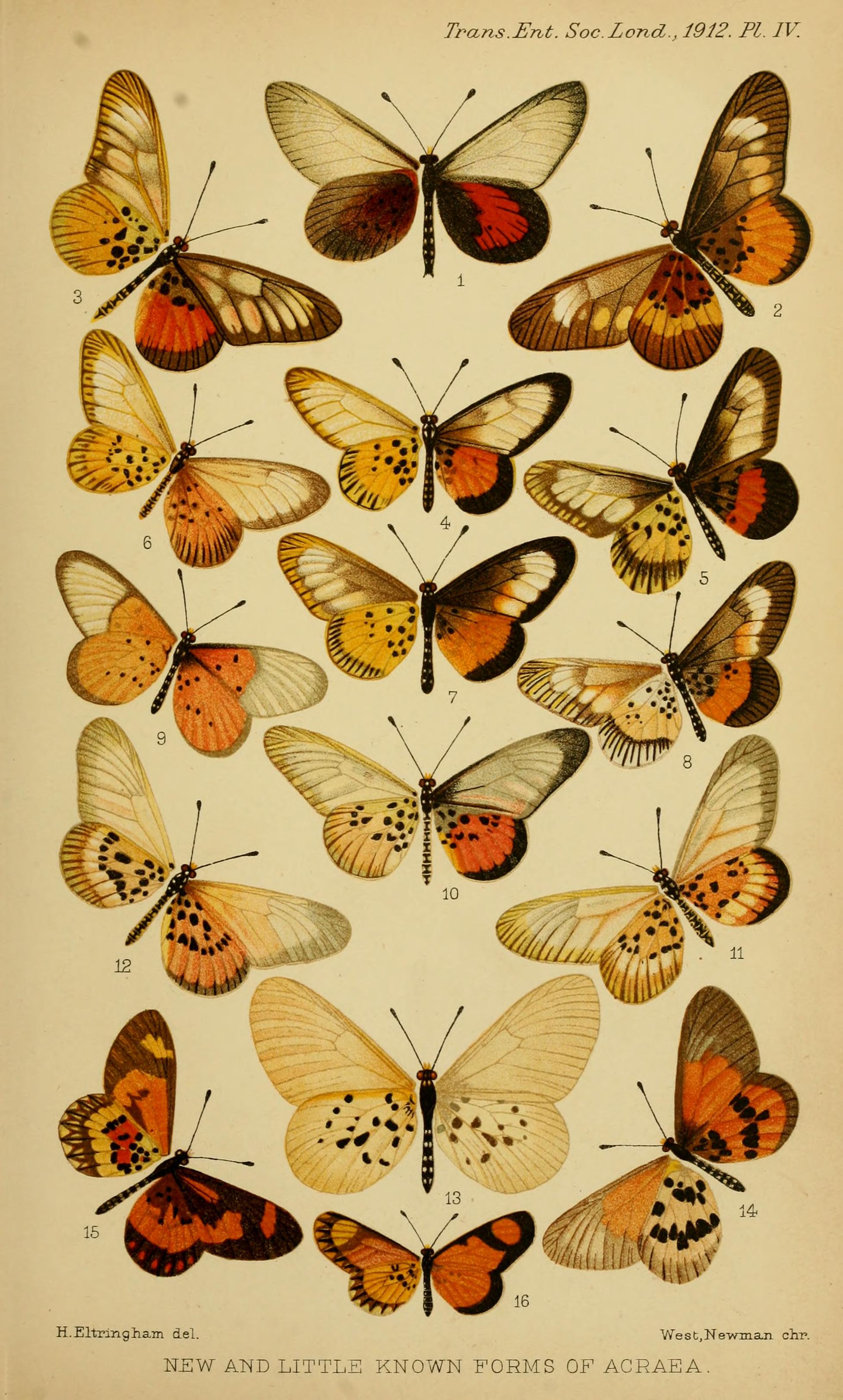
- Figure 4 male figure 6 female - holotype

Scientific classification
- Kingdom: Animalia
- Phylum: Arthropoda
- Class: Insecta
- Order: Lepidoptera
- Family: Nymphalidae
- Genus: Acraea
- Species: A. translucida

Binomial name
- Acraea translucida Eltringham, 1912

Synonyms
- Acraea penelope translucida Eltringham, 1912; Acraea (Actinote) translucida; Acraea penelope derubescens Eltringham, 1912

= Acraea translucida =

Species of butterfly

Acraea translucida, the translucent acraea, is a butterfly in the family Nymphalidae. It is found in Ghana, Togo, Nigeria, Cameroon and possibly Ivory Coast and Benin.

== Description ==
Very close to Acraea penelope q.v.

== Biology ==
The habitat consists of forests.

Adult males mud-puddle and both sexes are attracted to flowers, especially those of Eupatorium odorata.

== Taxonomy ==
It is a member of the Acraea circeis species group - but see also Pierre & Bernaud, 2014
