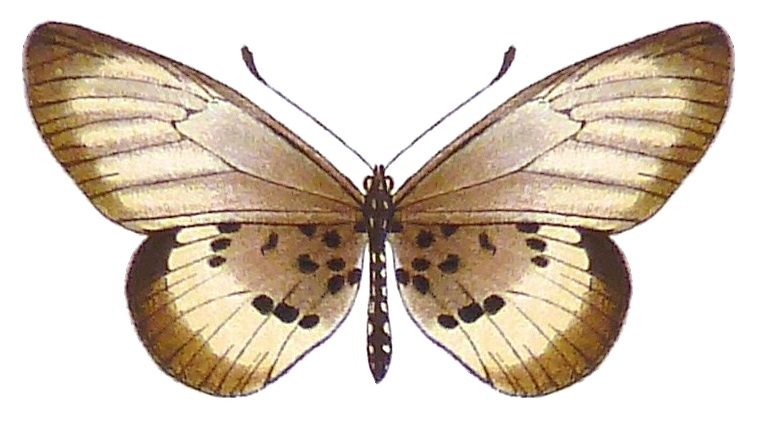

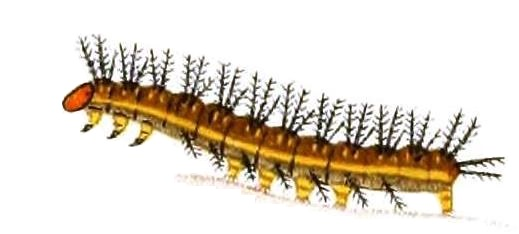
- Illustrated imago of Acraea peneleos f. lactimaculata in Seitz (1900) and larva of A. p. peneleos in Eltringham (1912)

Scientific classification
- Kingdom: Animalia
- Phylum: Arthropoda
- Clade: Pancrustacea
- Class: Insecta
- Order: Lepidoptera
- Family: Nymphalidae
- Genus: Acraea
- Species: A. peneleos

Binomial name
- Acraea peneleos Ward, 1871

Synonyms
- Acraea (Actinote) peneleos; Acraea peneleos f. helvimaculata Eltringham, 1912; Acraea peneleos f. lactimaculata Eltringham, 1912; Acraea peneleos f. sepia Eltringham, 1912; Acraea peneleos f. pseudopelasgius Strand, 1914; Acraea peneleos f. peneloides Strand, 1914; Acraea peneleos ab. castanea Schultze, 1923; Acraea peneleos peneleos ab. strigipygida Birket-Smith, 1960; Acraea pelasgius Grose-Smith, 1900

= Acraea peneleos =

Peneleos acraea

Species of butterfly

Acraea peneleos, the Peneleos acraea, is a butterfly in the family Nymphalidae, which is native to the tropics and northern subtropics of sub-Saharan Africa.

== Range ==
It is found in Guinea, Sierra Leone, Ivory Coast, Ghana, Togo, Nigeria, Cameroon, Equatorial Guinea, the Republic of the Congo, Angola, the Democratic Republic of the Congo, Uganda, Kenya, Zambia and Ethiopia.

== Description ==
A. peneleos may be most easily known in all its forms by the underside of the hindwing having a sharply defined light median band, the proximal ends of the longitudinal streaks in the distal part being joined by a brownish lunate line, which bounds the median band distally, while proximally it is bordered by the sharply defined and always darkened basal area; the veins and streaks on the under surface are not or little thickened and of uniform breadth.

- peneleos Ward (57 b; 1st fig.). In the male forewing the scaling is as in pelopeia male, with rounded, light reddish-scaled spots in 1b and 2 and a streak of the same colour in 1a; hindwing above blackish with a red to red-yellow median band about 7 mm. in breadth, which is distally rounded, and a marginal band 2-3 mm. in breadth; forewing beneath with the ground-colour grey-yellow to light yellow at the distal margin; hindwing beneath only slightly darkened at the base, its marginal band much broader than above, 4.5 mm. in breadth. The female differs much from the male; the basal part of the forewing is semitransparent light yellow- brown as far as the apex of the cell and vein 3, with an elongate dark spot in the cell and often also a rounded dark spot beyond the cell in the basal part of cellules 4–6; apex and marginal band lighter than in the male; hindwing above yellow-brown to the base, with free black dots, the discal dots often all present; marginal band scarcely more than 1mm. in breadth, proximally dentate at the veins; fore wing beneath diaphanous with yellow marginal band; hindwing beneath with light yellow median band 3 mm. in breadth behind the discal spots, in the basal area and at the distal margin darker, grey-yellow; the lunate line connecting the proximal ends of the marginal streaks as distinct as in the male. Sierra Leone to the Congo.
- female-ab. helvimaculata Eltr. only differs from the typical female in having the forewing diaphanous almost to the base, with very faint reddish tinge, while the upperside also of the hindwing has behind the discal dots a whitish median band 3 mm. in breadth, divided by the reddish veins. Lagos.
- female-ab. lactimaculata Eltr. (60 a). Wings entirely without red or brown markings; base of the forewing suffused with black-grey at least as far as vein 2. Hindwing on both surfaces dark grey in the basal area and at the distal margin, with white median band, beneath somewhat lighter than above. Fernando Po.
- female-ab. sepia Eltr. Forewing semitransparent with black-brown margins, traces of whitish spots in 1b and 2; hindwing above black-brown, with some red scales at the apex of the cell and the proximal side of the marginal band; inner margin yellowish; fore wing beneath yellowish at the margins; hindwing beneath grey-yellow with whitish median band. Fernando Po.
- pelasgius Smith is the eastern race, though it also occurs in West Africa as an aberration among the type-form; it is distinguished by having the basal area and the broad marginal band on the underside of the hindwing dark tawny, so that the light yellow median band stands out very sharply. Congo to Uganda; also as aberration in the Cameroons to Angola.
- gelonica Rothsch. and Jord. differs from pelasgius in the more transparent forewing and the chestnut-brown ground-colour of the hindwing beneath. Abyssinia. Larva dark brown with blackish, yellow-edged transverse dorsal streaks, yellow lateral lines and red-brown head; the spines black.

== Subspecies ==
- Acraea peneleos peneleos — Guinea, Sierra Leone, Ivory Coast, Ghana, Togo, Nigeria, south-western Cameroon, Bioko
- Acraea peneleos gelonica Rothschild & Jordan, 1905 — southern Ethiopia
- Acraea peneleos pelasgius Grose-Smith, 1900 — Cameroon, Congo, Angola, Democratic Republic of the Congo, Uganda, western Kenya, north-western Zambia

== Biology ==
The habitat consists of forests.

Adult males mud-puddle and both sexes are attracted to flowers, especially those of Eupatorium species.

The larvae feed on Urera cordifolia.

== Taxonomy ==
It is a member of the Acraea circeis species group.
