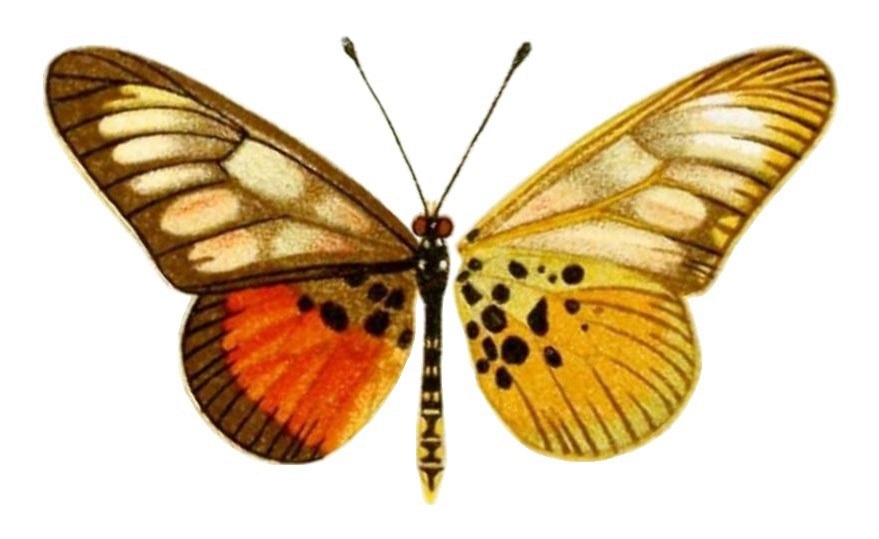

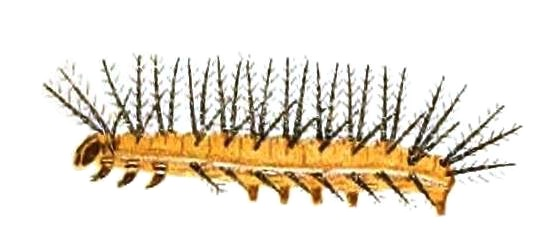
- A. p. parrhasia, imago and larva in Eltringham (1912)

Scientific classification
- Kingdom: Animalia
- Phylum: Arthropoda
- Clade: Pancrustacea
- Class: Insecta
- Order: Lepidoptera
- Family: Nymphalidae
- Genus: Acraea
- Species: A. parrhasia

Binomial name
- Acraea parrhasia (Fabricius, 1793)

Synonyms
- Papilio parrhasia Fabricius, 1793; Acraea (Actinote) parrhasia; Acraea servona Godart, 1819; Acraea leona var. parrhoppidia Staudinger, 1896; Acraea parrhasia f. pseudoppidia Strand, 1914; Acraea lycoides Boisduval, 1836; Acraea dejana Godman and Salvin, 1890; Acraea cerceis rhodina Rothschild & Jordan, 1905; Acraea servona f. rubra Eltringham, 1912; Acraea servona tenebrosa Eltringham, 1912; Acraea servona f. digitata Carpenter, 1935; Acraea servona tenebrosana Ackery, 1995; Acraea cerceis var. subochreata Grünberg, 1910; Acraea oppidia Hewitson, 1874; Acraea circeis var. orientis Aurivillius, 1904; Acraea cerceis ab. depunctella Strand, 1911; Acraea cerceis ab. unipunctella Strand, 1911; Acraea cerceis ab. semipunctella Strand, 1911; Acraea cerceis ab. transienda Strand, 1911

= Acraea parrhasia =

Yellow-veined acraea

Species of butterfly

Acraea parrhasia, the yellow-veined acraea, is a butterfly in the family Nymphalidae which is native to sub-Saharan Africa.

== Range ==
It is found in Guinea, Sierra Leone, Liberia, Ivory Coast, Ghana, Nigeria, Cameroon, Equatorial Guinea, Angola, the Democratic Republic of the Congo, Uganda, Ethiopia, Kenya, Tanzania and Zambia.

== Description ==
A. parrhasia F. (57 a, 59 e) is so similar in the male to the preceding species [Acraea peneleos] that it is sufficient to mention the differences. Fore wing semitransparent only at the margins, at the base and on the veins with dense blackish scaling, in 1b and in 2 an elongate, reddish-scaled spot; the spot in 1b is often continued towards the base as a reddish stripe; the cell usually with two separated reddish spots; spots in cellules 3-6 diaphanous; on the underside of the fore wing the margins and the median are scaled with yellow; the under surface of the hindwing is almost uniform yellow without dark marginal band and with the proximal ends of the marginal streaks free. The female is similar to the male but has the fore wing more obtuse with more indistinct and more elongate reddish spots and with whitish-scaled spots in cellules 4-6, it differs from peneleos female in the absence of the dark marginal band on the underside of the hindwing. Larva brown with very long black spines and light lateral line. Pupa light-coloured with the normal black markings; dorsal spots on the abdomen broadly separated, quadrate with light median dot; segments 2-7 with well developed obtuse projections. Sierra Leone to the Cameroons.

- female f. oppidia Hew. (57 a) has the red spots of the forewing more distinct and the whitish spots in cellules 4-6 more sharply defined. Fernando Po.
- female f. parrhoppidia Stgr. The cell and cellules lb and 2 of the fore wing almost entirely red; spots 4-6 diaphanous. Cameroons.
- female f. leona Stgr. (= leonina Baker). Fore wing except at the margins almost diaphanous; hindwing above yellow-brown to the base, next to the narrow marginal band lighter yellowish; under surface as in the type-form but much lighter; is similar to the female of peneleos but more transparent and easy to recognize by the underside of the hindwing. Sierra Leone.

A. servona. Median band on the upperside of the hindwing distally more or less rounded, nearly always lemon-yellow to sulphur-yellow; the streaks on the folds of the hindwing beneath are of uniform breadth and reach the distal margin; base of the hindwing above darkened at most to vein 2; forewing with transparent spots in cellules 1-6 and the apex of the cell, the spots in cellules 1b and 3 are sometimes indistinct or entirely absent; beneath the black parts of the upperside are light yellow to red-brown.

- servona Godt. (= lycoides Bdv.) (57 b). Spots in cellules 1b and 3 of the forewing distinct; the dark basal area on the upperside of the hindwing reaches vein 2; under surface with the ground-colour yellow; median band of the hindwing sulphur-yellow. Cameroons to Angola.
- orientis Auriv. (57 c). Ground-colour of the upper surface deeper black, of the under grey-yellow; the spots in 1b and 3 of the forewing are absent or indistinct and small, the others with distinct white scaling; dark basal area of the hindwing above small, not reaching vein 2. Hindwing beneath with two black dots in the cell and two in cellule 7. German East Africa. Strand has named the following trifling aberrations of this race: ab. depunctella Strand. Hindwing without black dots in the cell and with 1 or 2 in cellule 7. German East Africa, ab. unipunctella Strand. One dot in the cell and 2 in cellule 7 of the hindwing. German East Africa, ab. semipunctella Strand. One dot in the cell and one in cellule 7 of the hindwing. German East Africa, ab. transienda Strand only differs from semipunctella in having the light spots in cellules 1b and 3 of the forewing more distinct. German East Africa.
- rhodina Rothsch. (= subochreata Grunb.) [ now Acraea pharsalus rhodina ] (60 d) has the ground-colour of the under surface red-brown, but otherwise agrees with the type-form. Uganda and Abyssinia.
- female ab. rubra Eltr. (60 d) differs from all the other forms of this species in having the median band on the upperside of the hindwing narrower and red; the marginal band of the hindwing as broad as the median band or somewhat broader; fore wing spotted as in orientis. Gaboon and Angola.
- limonata Eltr. Only males known; they differ from the type-form in having the light spots in cellules 1 b and 2 on the upperside of the forewing scaled with lemon-yellow instead of transparent. Fernando Po.
- tenebrosa Eltr. Under surface as in rhodina, only somewhat darker; forewing as in orientis; the median band of the hindwing reaches neither the costal nor the inner margin. German East Africa.
- f. ? reversa Eltr. has the tarsal claws of the male of unequal size, whilst in all the other forms they are equal in size; otherwise said to agree with the type-form. Congo.

== Biology ==
The habitat consists of forests.

The larvae feed on Urtica species (including U. rigida) and Dioscorea smilacifolia.

== Subspecies ==
- A. p. parrhasia — Guinea, Sierra Leone, Liberia, Ivory Coast, Ghana, Nigeria, western Cameroon
- A. p. kenya van Someren & Rogers, 1926 — Kenya: north-eastern slopes of Mount Kenya and the Njombeni Hills
- A. p. limonata Eltringham, 1912 — Bioko
- A. p. orientis Aurivillius, 1904 — eastern and north-eastern Tanzania, Kenya: south-east to the Teita Hills
- A. p. servona Godart, 1819 — Nigeria, Cameroon, Angola, Democratic Republic of the Congo, Uganda, southern Ethiopia, western Kenya, north-western Zambia

Torben Larsen developed a species numbering system for his 2005 publication Butterflies of West Africa. The nominate subspecies is #1148. The 'Larsen' numbers have since been used with permission in A Sharp Eye on Butterflies of Ghana.

== Taxonomy ==
It is a member of the Acraea circeis species group - but see also Pierre & Bernaud, 2014
