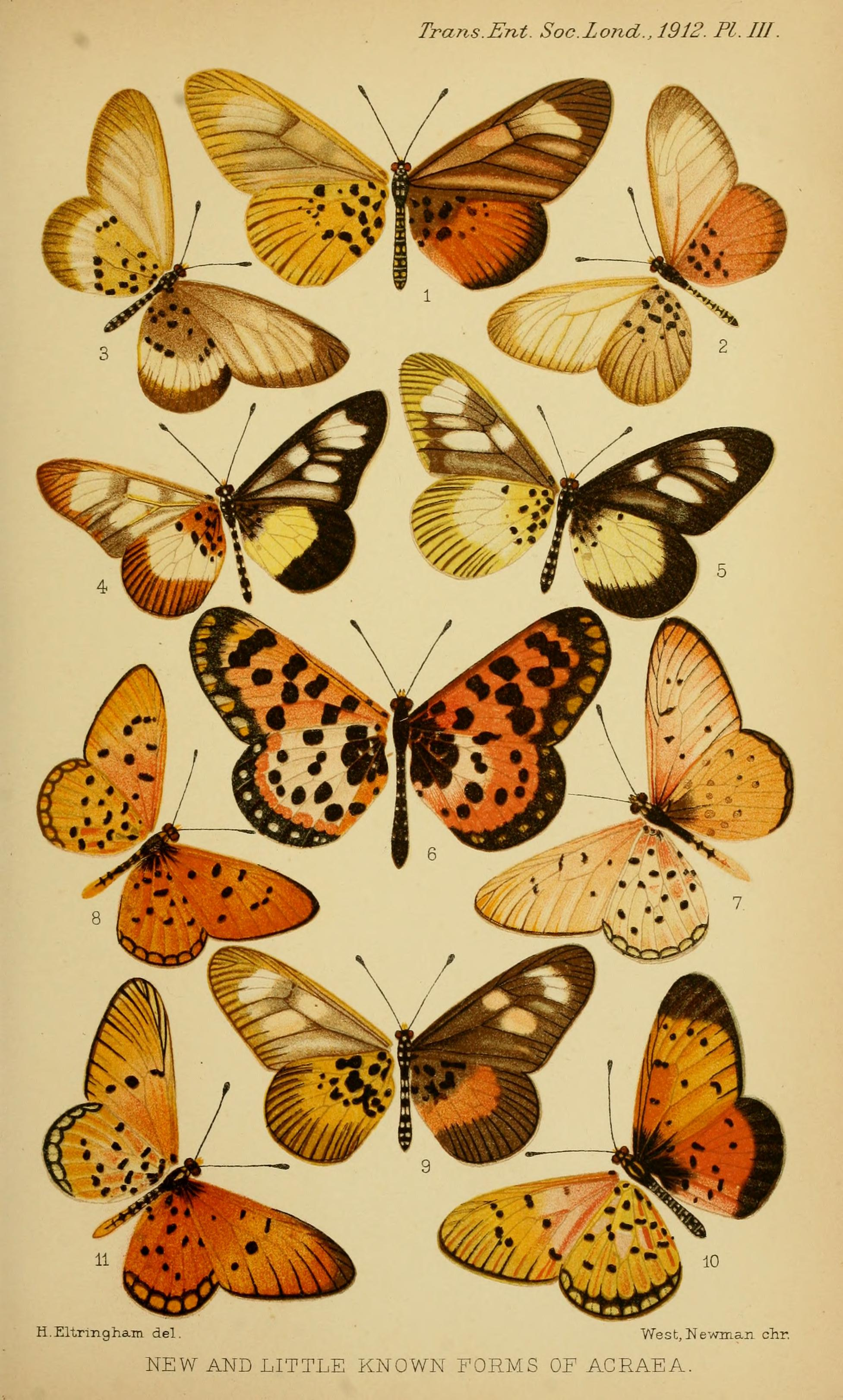

Scientific classification
- Kingdom: Animalia
- Phylum: Arthropoda
- Clade: Pancrustacea
- Class: Insecta
- Order: Lepidoptera
- Family: Nymphalidae
- Genus: Acraea
- Species: A. circeis

Binomial name
- Acraea circeis (Drury, 1782)

Synonyms
- Papilio circeis Drury, 1782; Acraea (Actinote) circeis; Papilio mandane Fabricius, 1793; Papilio opis Herbst, 1793; Acraea leona Staudinger, 1896; Acraea igola leonina Bethune-Baker, 1903; Acraea servona f. reversa Eltringham, 1912

= Acraea circeis =

White acraea

Species of butterfly

Acraea circeis, the white acraea, is a butterfly in the family Nymphalidae. It is found in Sierra Leone, Liberia, Ivory Coast, Ghana, Nigeria, Cameroon, Bioko, the Republic of the Congo, northern Angola and the south-western part of the Democratic Republic of the Congo.

== Description ==
A. circeis Drury is very similar to the type-form of the preceding [ A. parrhasia servona ] Godart, 1819, merely differing in having the forewing black-scaled only at the margins and on the veins, otherwise almost transparent, while the light yellow median band of the hindwing is of uniform breadth with the distal boundary almost straight. Sierra Leone to North Angola.

Torben Larsen developed a species numbering system for his 2005 publication Butterflies of West Africa. This species is #1144. The 'Larsen' numbers have since been used with permission in A Sharp Eye on Butterflies of Ghana.

== Biology ==
The habitat consists of forests.

The larvae feed on Urera oblongifolia.

== Taxonomy ==
It is a member of the Acraea circeis species group- but see also Pierre & Bernaud, 2014
