= Miriam Soljak =

New Zealand feminist (1879–1971)

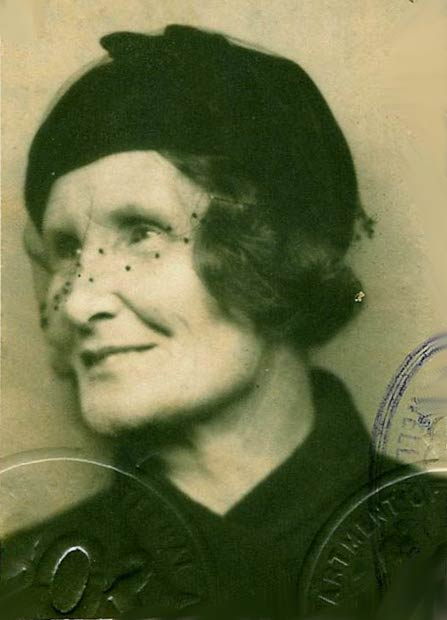
- Soljak in a passport photograph, 1936
- Born: Miriam Bridelia Cummings; 15 June 1879; Thames, New Zealand
- Died: 28 March 1971 (aged 91); Auckland, New Zealand
- Occupations: Teacher; women's rights activist
- Years active: 1919–1946
- Known for: Campaigning for women's individual nationality legislation
- Relatives: Connie Purdue (daughter); Rosanne Meo (granddaughter); Sean Fitzpatrick (great‑grandson); Samantha Scott (great‑granddaughter)

Miriam Bridelia Soljak (née Cummings; 15 June 1879 – 28 March 1971) was a pioneering New Zealand feminist, communist, unemployed rights activist and supporter of family planning efforts. Born in Thames, New Zealand, she was raised as a Catholic and studied to be a teacher. From 1898 to 1912, she taught in native schools, learning about Māori culture and becoming fluent in the language. In 1908, she married Peter Soljak, an immigrant from Dalmatia, now part of Croatia, but at the time part of the Austrian Empire. In 1919, because of war legislation, she was denaturalised and forced to register as an enemy alien, because of her marriage. Despite their divorce in 1939, Soljak was unable to recover her British nationality.

In protest, Soljak led a campaign that lasted for nearly thirty years for women to have their own individual nationality in New Zealand. She was involved in health issues which included child welfare, family planning and contraception, infant and maternal mortality, and sex education. Economic concerns such as mother's endowments, pensions for elders and the infirm, unemployment compensation for women, as well as policies that assisted homeless women, widows, and separated women were also a focus of Soljak's work. She also strove to support indigenous communities, becoming involved in the protection of Māori women and girls and Samoan independence movement, though she was a pacifist. In 1946, New Zealand amended the nationality law, changing the policy that a woman automatically acquired her husband's nationality upon marriage.

== Early life and education ==
Miriam Bridelia Cummings was born on 15 June 1879 in Thames to Annie (née Cunningham) and Matthew Cummings. Her mother was of Scottish heritage and her father, a carpenter, was from Ireland. There were eight siblings in the family and because of their parents' religious differences, the boys were raised as Protestant and the girls as Catholic. Cummings attended school in Thames and New Plymouth for her high school education. In 1896, she entered the pupil-teacher programme at New Plymouth Central School and finished her apprenticeship at Kauaeranga School in Thames.

== Teaching (1898–1919) ==
In 1898, Cummings took up a teaching post at Taumarere Native School in Northland. Moving to Pukaru (also shown as Pakaru), near Kawakawa, she lived with a Māori family and taught at the native school. Cummings became very interested in the Māori culture and the welfare of the Ngāpuhi Maori communities in that area. She became fluent in the Māori language. She left the area and in 1905 had a daughter, Dorothea Grace, in Auckland. Moving to Rotorua, she worked as a domestic in private homes until 10 June 1908, when she married Peter Soljak. He was an immigrant from Dalmatia, at the time part of the Austrian Empire, who had little education or fluency in English, but was prepared to work at various jobs to support the family. He had left his homeland to avoid conscription into the Austrian army and strongly opposed Austrian rule in Dalmatia. At one time he worked as a gumdigger and at the time of their marriage, was a restaurateur.

Resuming her teaching at Pukaru in 1910, Soljak was provided with nursery care for her children because of her skill working with Māori students. Peter worked nearby in Kawakawa building a bridge. When Soljak gave birth to her fourth child in 1912, she left teaching and the family moved to Tauranga, where Peter worked on various construction and transport projects. They struggled financially and moved often. Soon after World War I ended, when her seventh child, Paul, was born in 1919, Soljak was refused a bed in the maternity home and told it was because she was an enemy alien and had forfeited her nationality by marrying a foreigner. Given the option of prison or registration, Soljak registered as an alien "under protest". The action also revoked her right to vote.

== Nationality issues and beginning of activism ==
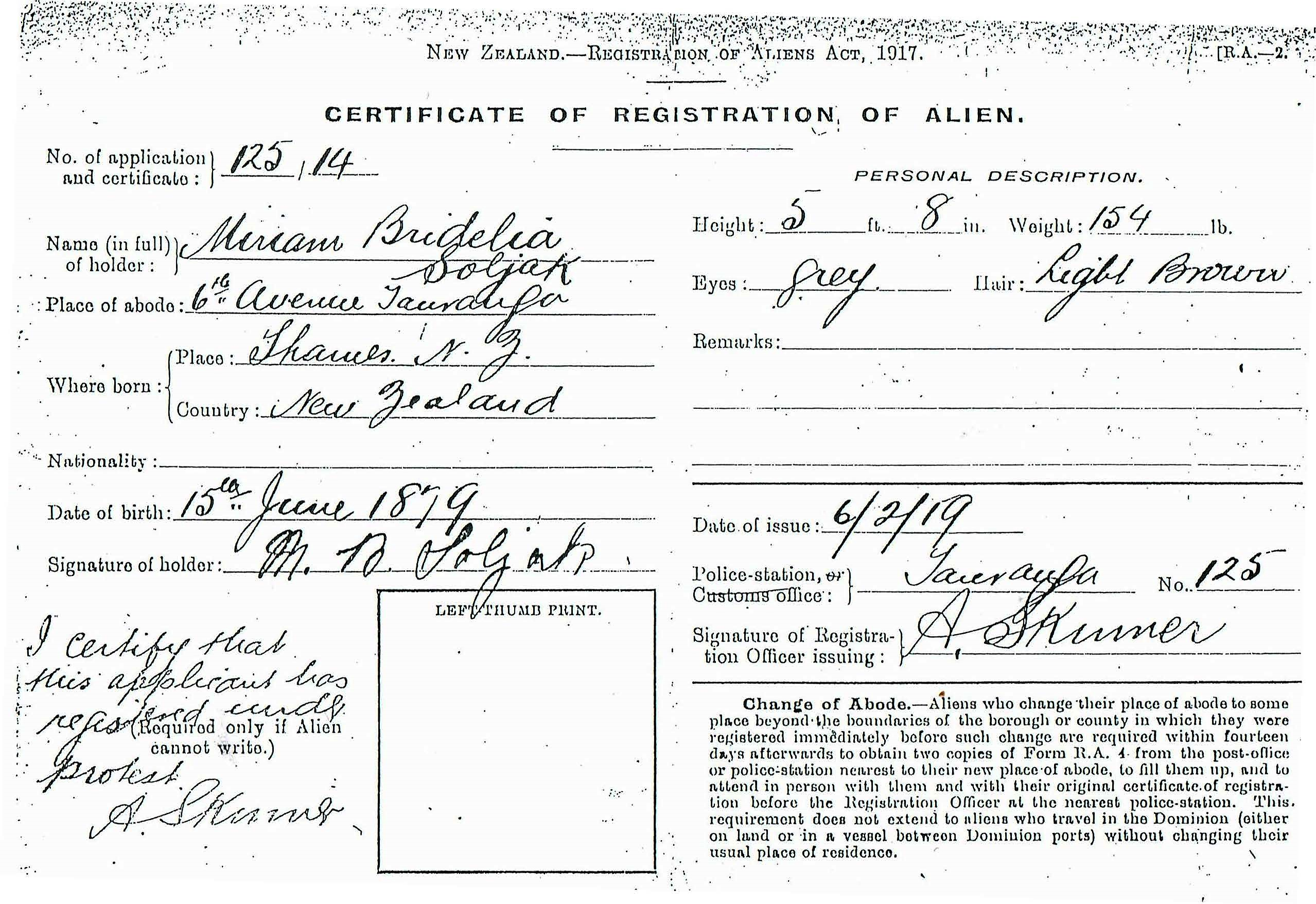
Certificate of Registration of Alien for Soljak, 1919

New Zealand's first nationality law, the Aliens Act of 1866, specified that foreign women who married New Zealanders automatically acquired the nationality of the husband. It applied only to the wives of British subjects. Because of the way British nationality laws were drafted, persons became subjects or were naturalised as British based upon local definitions for each jurisdiction. There was not an overriding imperial definition for who was a British subject. This meant that someone could be a British subject in one part of the empire, but not considered British in another part of the dominions of Britain. In 1914, this was rectified when the British Nationality and Status of Aliens Act provided that the nationality of a British subject would be the same for each place within the realm. New Zealand introduced a measure to adopt the common code of British nationality in 1914, but passage was postponed by the outbreak of the war.

War measures such as the 1916 Amendment to the War Regulations Act and the Revocation of Naturalisation Act and Registration of Aliens Act of 1917 addressed denaturalisation procedures for women. Under the 1916 amendment, wives of enemy aliens were automatically denaturalised as enemy aliens, even if they had been born British. Provisions in the 1917 Revocation of Naturalisation Act stated that revocation of an enemy alien's nationality did not impact his wife and minor children. The Registration Act merely required an alien to list the names and ages of his wife and children. However, an amendment to the Registration of Aliens Act in 1920 clarified that married women in New Zealand who lost their nationality because of marriage were required to register as aliens. Despite the contradictory provisions in the law, women like Soljak were deprived of their nationality during the war. The experience turned her life towards activism, bringing her to national prominence.

== Political activism (1920–1946) ==
In 1920, the family moved to Auckland and Soljak joined the Auckland Women's Political League, which five years later became the Auckland women's branch of the New Zealand Labour Party. Soljak led a public fight, alongside Elizabeth McCombs, against the nationality laws, speaking to Parliament and publishing articles in the local papers on the unfairness of the legislation. With the break-up of the Austrian Empire, Peter chose to align his nationality with the Kingdom of Serbs, Croats and Slovenes, later Yugoslavia, in 1922. In 1923, New Zealand adopted the British nationality scheme, which clearly specified that New Zealand women who married foreign men automatically lost their nationality upon marriage. Working with allies like Emily Gibson and Peter Fraser, Soljak pressed for legislation for women to have independent nationality. Fraser introduced a bill in 1927, but it was unsuccessful. In 1928, Peter Soljak naturalised, (Note: Included in his British naturalisation certificate were his children: Philip (born 2 July 1908), Eva (born 3 November 1909), Constance (born 26 May 1912), Laurence (born 12 March 1914), Bernard (born 29 December 1915), and Paul (born 23 May 1919).) and through his action Soljak regained her British nationality under an amendment passed in 1935, but only while in New Zealand. When travelling abroad, she had to use a passport which was marked "New Zealand born, wife of an alien, now naturalised" and regularly register with the police.

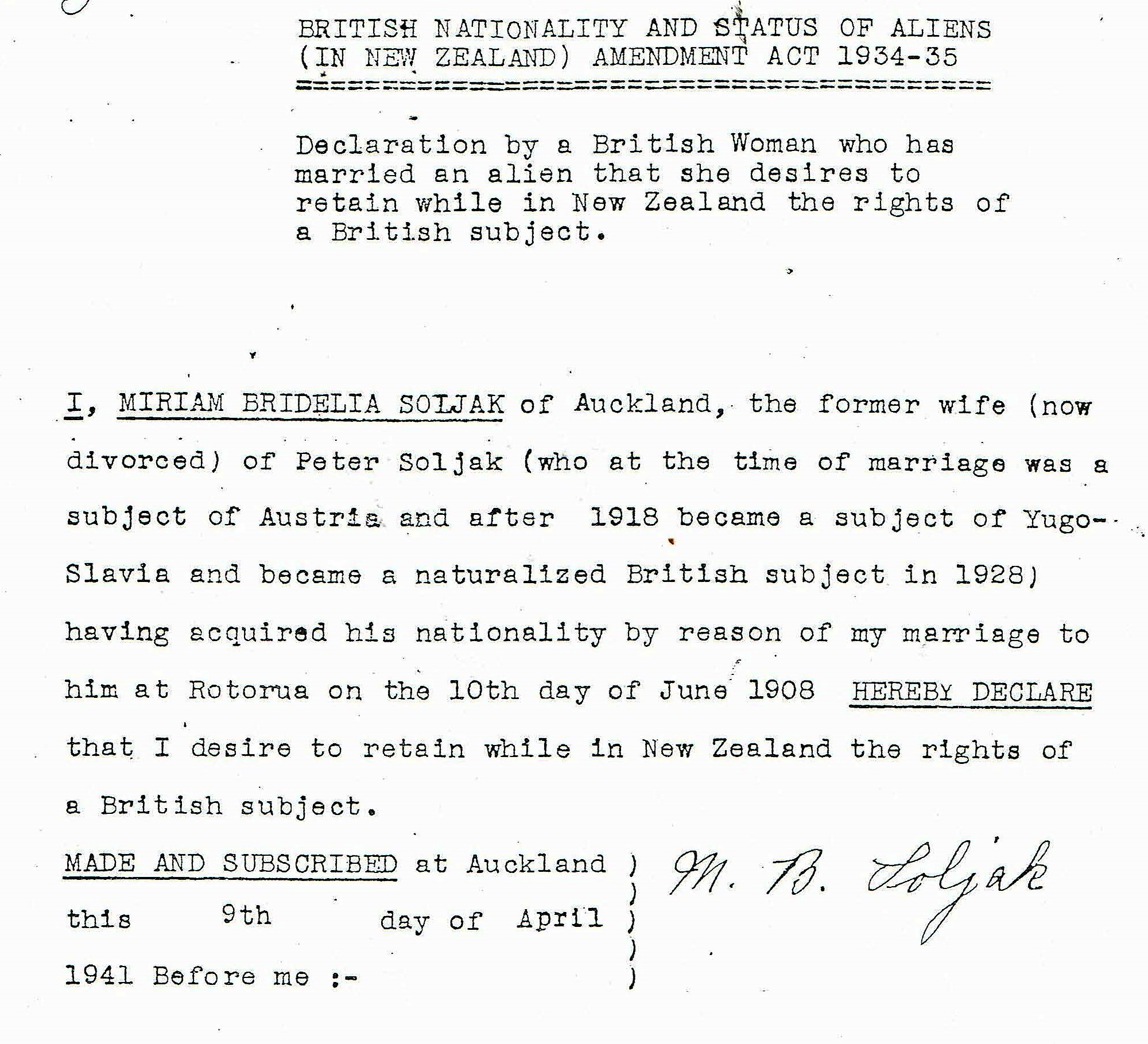
Soljak's Declaration of British Nationality, 1941

From 1926, Soljak worked on women's issues. She fought for women to receive unemployment benefits, as politicians ignored their homelessness and their need to work. In 1931, she worked on the Auckland Unemployed Women's Emergency Committee, but resigned when she realised there were no funds to help women and that their actions would only be to compile a registry of unemployed women. Because of the perception that many Māori women participated in prostitution, Soljak pressed for training to combat their economic hardships and the social ostracism they experienced in the workplace. She stressed that Māori women and girls had civil rights and should be able to choose their own employment and be free of exploitation. She pointed out that Māori women often had to take whatever work they could find. This was borne out in an inquiry undertaken by the Labour Department at the insistence of the Akarana Maori Association, which found few instances of immorality among Maori girls and women, but noted they had difficulty earning enough to provide for themselves and their families. She suggested that hostels be established to train Māori women in child care, domestic service, and nursing.

Soljak was involved in the pacifist movement, as well as advocating for sex education and programmes to address maternal and child mortality, child welfare, and payments to mothers to recognise their contributions to the nation through raising children. She began working as a freelance journalist and was a sought-after public speaker, though her style was hard-hitting and confrontational. In 1928, Soljak was elected president of the Auckland women's branch of the Labour Party and re-elected to the post in 1929. The Soljaks separated in 1929, primarily because Peter did not agree with her radical politics and the people with whom she was associating. The following year, she sought a legal separation, but Peter refused to agree, denying Soljak alimony or child maintenance. Working with the Women's International League for Peace and Freedom between 1930 and 1931, she led an initiative to assist women in Samoa. She condemned the suppression of Samoa's pro-independence Mau movement in 1930, and was at odds with the Labour Party hierarchy over the issue. After she wrote an article in May, which was published in the Samoa Guardian protesting searches of the homes of independence leaders, she was ousted from the women's branch of the Labour Party. She then aligned with the Communist Party of New Zealand and joined other radical organisations.

After being counselled by a priest that family size could be controlled by abstinence, Soljak left the Catholic church and began campaigning for women to be able to gain access to contraception and family planning. Using the pen name "Zealandia", she wrote a series of articles for The New Zealand Herald on the topic and attended a Wellington conference in 1934, advocating for birth control. After the conference, she helped found the Sex Hygiene and Birth Regulation Society, renamed the New Zealand Family Planning Association in 1940. In 1935, Soljak led a deputation of members of the Women Workers' Movement to the Prime Minister's office to demand changes to the Women's Unemployment Committees. In the manifesto she presented were demands to disband the committees and terminate the current leadership replacing them with labour bureaux for women, which would be run by women; for government employment placement services for women; for payments to elders, the infirm, and widows; and revised policies concerning separated wives of men who were obtaining relief subsidies.

Under the sponsorship of the Women's International League for Peace and Freedom, Soljak attended a Commonwealth women's conference in London (1936–37), where presentations covered such topics as the lack of equal rights for women, peace and social initiatives, trafficking, and women's nationality and immigration rights. She presented a talk to the conference on women's nationality issues in New Zealand. Soljak was finally awarded family maintenance in 1936, but during her trip abroad, Peter attempted to terminate the payments. In 1938, she filed for divorce and was granted a decree nisi, and the divorce was finalised in 1939. Soljak found that she was still classed as a foreign national, despite her New Zealand birth and the termination of her marriage, as the law had no provisions for a woman to recover her nationality lost upon marriage. When the Social Security Act was passed in 1938, she wrote an article in Women Today criticising the fact that though the act entitled single women workers to an unemployment benefit, it paid married women's benefits to their husbands.

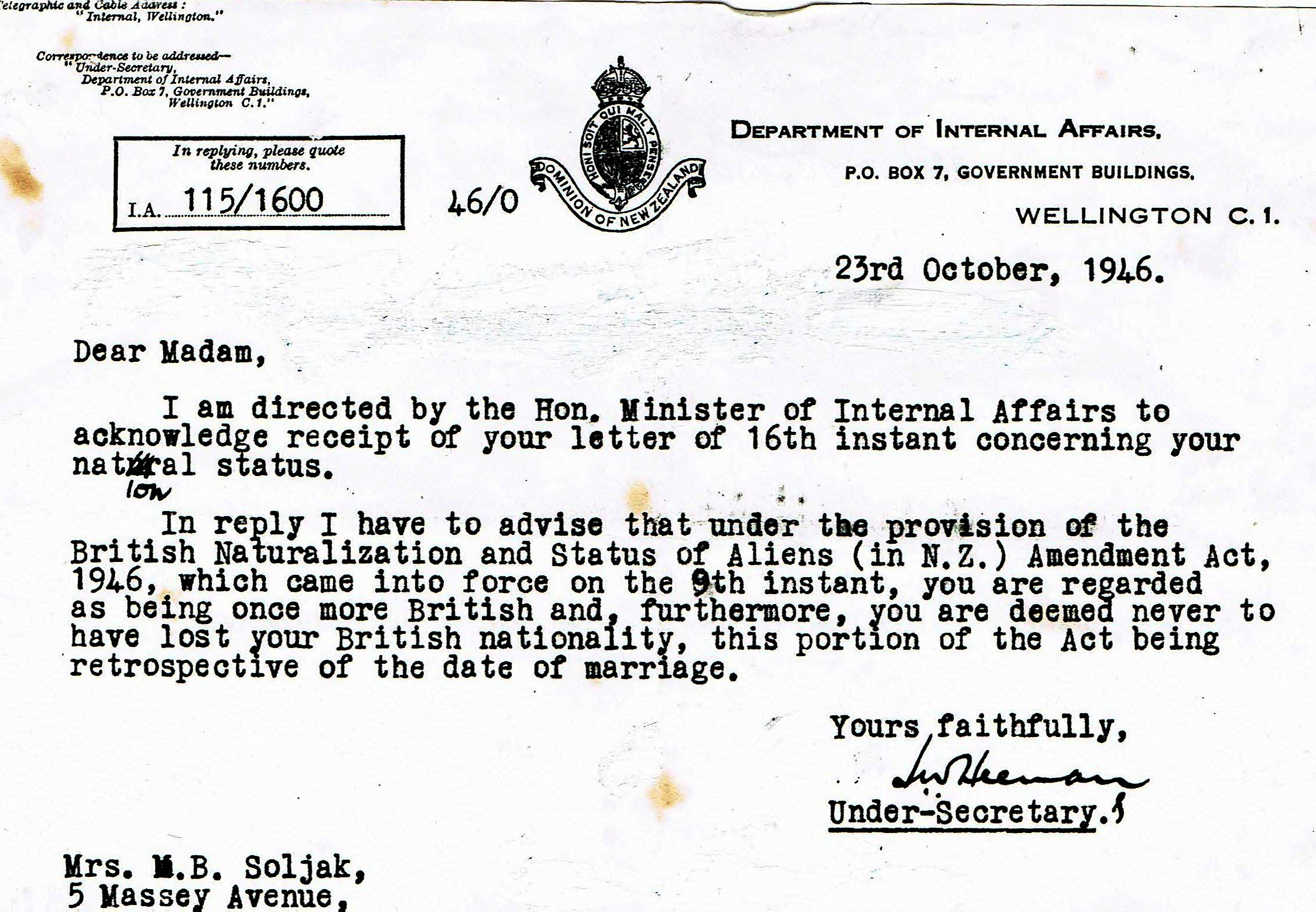
Under Secretary Heenan's letter to Soljak, 1946

Soljak joined the New Zealand Rationalist Association in 1940 and in 1941 was elected to serve on the executive committee. The organisation protested the government's treatment of conscientious objectors. That year she continued her campaign against the nationality law, speaking on behalf of the United Women's Movement delegation to the Minister of Internal Affairs. She pointed out that women should have their own nationality and that the current law also impacted the nationality of their children. Soljak continued to campaign throughout the war on behalf of the United Women's Movement, serving as its treasurer in 1944, and the Women's International League for Peace and Freedom. She pressed for adequate housing for families, as most of the available units had been given to soldiers; for not allowing children's protection to lose focus because of attention to the war effort; and for peace initiatives. At the end of World War II, she retired from public life to look after her son Paul, who had been wounded in the war. They lived in Point Chevalier. In 1946, Soljak's nationality was restored, when the New Zealand nationality law was finally revised to grant women individual nationality. In the letter from the Internal Affairs Minister, signed by under-secretary Joe Heenan, which responded to her request for restoration of her nationality, he stated, "you are deemed never to have lost your British nationality". Eventually, she rejoined the Labour Party and was given a gold badge of service for her work over many years.

== Death and legacy ==
Soljak died in Auckland on 28 March 1971. She is remembered for her advocacy on behalf of working women and the Māori people, as well as her decades-long efforts to address gender discrimination in nationality laws. The Soljak family papers are housed in the Dalmatian Archive of the Auckland Council Libraries. Her son Philip became an author and her daughter Connie Purdue went on to become a leading name in the New Zealand anti-abortion movement. Connie's granddaughter is theatre director Samantha Scott. In 2020, Soljak was the subject of a series of mixed-media acrylic paintings, featured at the Waiheke Community Art Gallery as "Signed under Protest" and created by her granddaughter, Katy Soljak.

== Bibliography ==
- Baldwin, M. Page (October 2001). "Subject to Empire: Married Women and the British Nationality and Status of Aliens Act". Journal of British Studies. 40 (4). Chicago, Illinois: University of Chicago Press: 522–556. doi:10.1086/386266. ISSN 0021-9371. JSTOR 3070746. OCLC 4637986477. PMID 18161209. S2CID 5762190.
- "Book on New Zealand". Bay of Plenty Times. Vol. LXXVI, no. 14541. Tauranga, New Zealand. 9 December 1947. p. 2 – via Papers Past.
- Božić Vrbančić, Senka (2008). "Mamine priče o sunčanoj dalmaciji" [Mom's Stories about Sunny Dalmatia]. Hrvatski iseljenički zbornik (in Croatian). Zagreb, Croatia: Croatian Heritage Foundation: 259–271. ISSN 1330-3724 – via Internet Archive.
- Bremner, Dorthea G. (1976). "Scottish Pioneers in Early Tauranga, New Zealand". Auckland Museum. Auckland, New Zealand: Auckland War Memorial Museum.
- Brookes, Barbara L. (2016). A History of New Zealand Women. Wellington, New Zealand: Bridget Williams Books. ISBN 978-0-908321-45-2.
- "Casualties in N.Z.E.F". The Press. Vol. LXXX, no. 24285. Christchurch, New Zealand. 16 June 1944. p. 6 – via Papers Past.
- "Clubs and Societies: United Women's Movement". Auckland Star. Vol. LXXIV, no. 93. Auckland, New Zealand. 20 April 1943. p. 3 – via Papers Past.
- "Clubs and Societies: United Women's Movement". Auckland Star. Vol. LXXV, no. 60. Auckland, New Zealand. 11 March 1944. p. 7 – via Papers Past.
- Green, David (8 February 2005). "Citizenship - Towards New Zealand Citizenship". Te Ara - the Encyclopedia of New Zealand. Wellington, New Zealand: Encyclopaedia of New Zealand. Archived from the original on 25 January 2021.
- Hall, T. D. H. (August 1931). "Status of Aliens in New Zealand". Pacific Affairs. 4 (8). Vancouver, British Columbia: University of British Columbia: 700–710. doi:10.2307/2750412. ISSN 0030-851X. JSTOR 2750412. OCLC 5545501061.
- Hoare, Nicholas (2020). "7. Anticolonialism and the Politics of Friendship in New Zealand's Pacific". In Carey, Jane; Steel, Frances (eds.). Colonial Formations. Abingdon, Oxfordshire: Routledge. pp. 142–160. ISBN 978-0-367-61860-5.
- "Housing Problem". Auckland Star. Vol. LXXV, no. 110. Auckland, New Zealand. 11 May 1944. p. 6 – via Papers Past.
- "Index of wartime laws and regulations, 1914–21". nzhistory.govt.nz. Wellington, New Zealand: Ministry for Culture and Heritage. 20 April 2015. Archived from the original on 1 May 2021.
- "Kiwis Who Left Their Mark on the Nation". The New Zealand Herald. Auckland, New Zealand. 29 December 2000. Archived from the original on 9 October 2021.
- "Labour Women". The Sun. Vol. III, no. 627. Auckland, New Zealand. 2 April 1929. p. 16 – via Papers Past.
- Legislative Council and House of Representatives (1920). "Parliamentary Debates: First Session, Twentieth Parliament: 6 August to 24 September 1920". Journals of the House of Representatives of New Zealand. 187. Wellington, New Zealand: Marcus F. Marks, Government Printer. ISSN 0110-3415.
- "Marriage Fails: Wife Seeks Divorce". The New Zealand Herald. Vol. LXXV, no. 23215. Auckland, New Zealand. 8 December 1938. p. 19 – via Papers Past.
- McLintock, A. H.; Wilson, James Oakley (1966). "Nationality". Te Ara - the Encyclopedia of New Zealand. Wellington, New Zealand: Encyclopaedia of New Zealand. Archived from the original on 24 February 2018.
- Mercer, Harriet J. (October 2018). "Gender and the Myth of a White Zealand, 1866–1928" (PDF). New Zealand Journal of History. 52 (2). Auckland, New Zealand: University of Auckland: 23–41. ISSN 0028-8322. OCLC 7943409925. Archived (PDF) from the original on 8 October 2021.
- "N.Z. Labour Party". The Sun. Vol. II, no. 327. Auckland, New Zealand. 12 April 1928. p. 12 – via Papers Past.
- "Not Admitted". Auckland Star. Vol. LXII, no. 292. Auckland, New Zealand. 10 December 1931. p. 27 – via Papers Past.
- Page, Dorothy (1991). "Miriam Soljak". In Macdonald, Charlotte; Penfold, Merimeri; Williams, Bridget (eds.). The Book of New Zealand Women: Ko Kui Ma Te Kaupapa. Wellington, New Zealand: Bridget Williams Books. pp. 611–614. doi:10.7810/9780908912049. ISBN 978-0-908912-04-9.
- Page, Dorothy (1998). "Soljak, Miriam Bridelia". Te Ara - the Encyclopedia of New Zealand. Wellington, New Zealand: Dictionary of New Zealand Biography. Archived from the original on 4 March 2021.
- "Rationalist Assn. Annual Meeting". Auckland Star. Vol. LXXII, no. 251. Auckland, New Zealand. 23 October 1941. p. 9 – via Papers Past.
- "Registration of Aliens Act" (PDF). New Zealand Legal Information Institute. Wellington, New Zealand: New Zealand Parliament. 1917. 8 GEO V 1917 No 12c. Archived (PDF) from the original on 1 June 2021.
- "Return to Old Suffrage Ideas". Auckland Star. Vol. LXVIII, no. 258. Auckland, New Zealand. 30 October 1937. p. 14 – via Papers Past.
- "Sex Equality: Married Women, Law of Nationality". Auckland Star. Vol. LXXII, no. 262. Auckland, New Zealand. 5 November 1941. p. 8 – via Papers Past.
- "'Signed Under Protest'". Canvas Magazine. The New Zealand Herald. Auckland, New Zealand. 26 September 2020 – via PressReader.
- "Signed Under Protest – Katy Soljak". Waiheke Community Art Gallery. Waiheke Island, Auckland. 11 September 2020. Archived from the original on 8 February 2021.
- "Soljak Family". Kura, Auckland Libraries. Auckland, New Zealand: Auckland Council Libraries. 2009. Dalmatian Archive and Museum Record Archive #DGHS-017. Archived from the original on 17 October 2021.
- Van Dongen, Yvonne (1993). "The Fight of Miriam Soljak". In Coney, Sandra (ed.). Standing in the Sunshine: A History of New Zealand Women Since They Won the Vote. Auckland, New Zealand: Viking. p. 131. ISBN 978-0-670-84628-3.
- "Want Men Sacked". The Northern Advocate. Whangārei, New Zealand. 20 December 1935. p. 3 – via Papers Past.
- "Women's Rights: Problems of Nationality". The New Zealand Herald. Vol. 78, no. 24115. Auckland, New Zealand. 6 November 1941. p. 11 – via Papers Past.
- "Women's Status". Auckland Star. Vol. LXII, no. 215. Auckland, New Zealand. 11 September 1931. p. 3 – via Papers Past.
