= Connie Purdue =

New Zealand trade unionist

Connie Purdue MBE
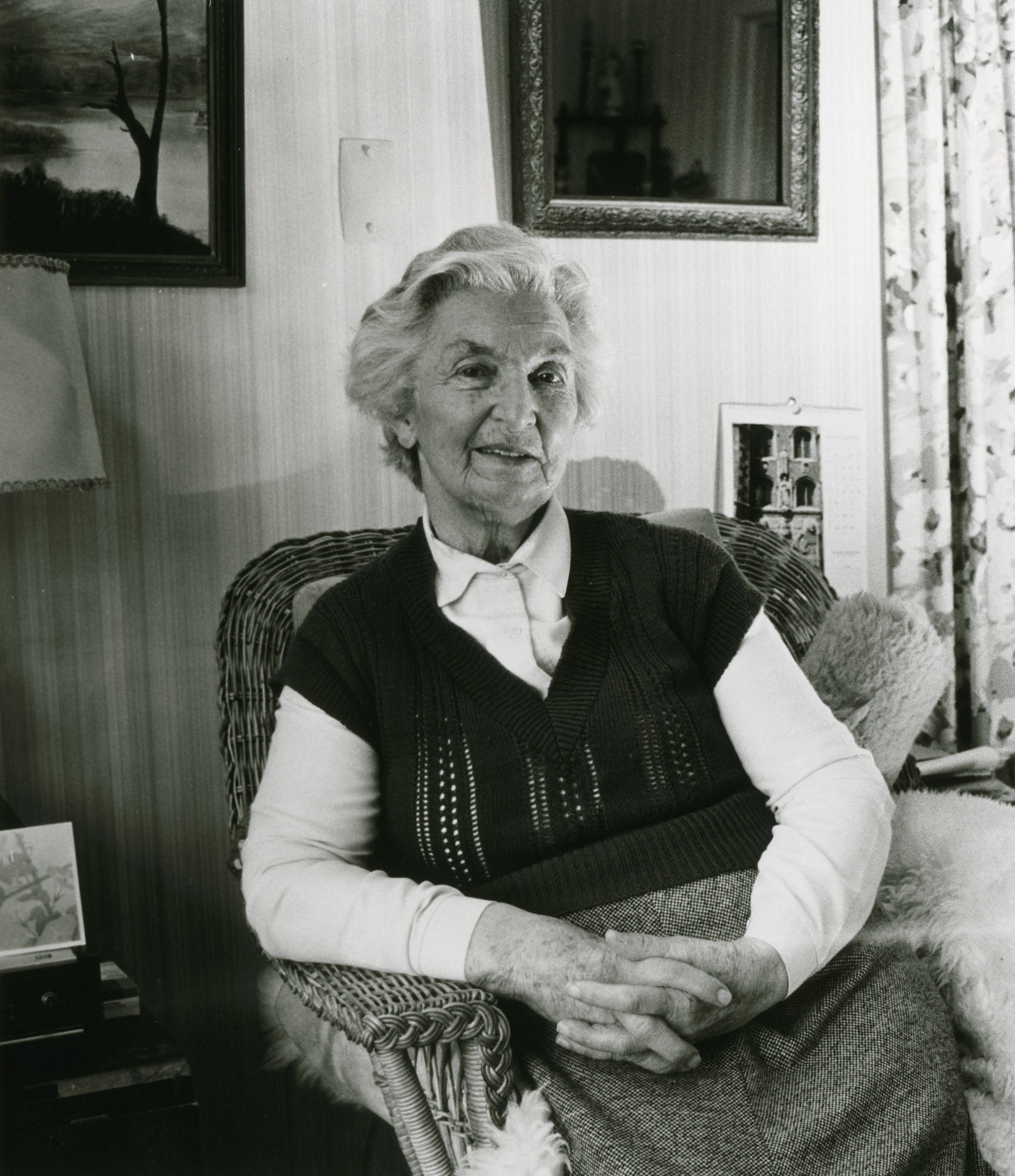
- Purdue photographed for the Takapuna Library in 1992
- Born: Constance Miriam Purdue; 23 May 1912; Auckland, New Zealand
- Died: 16 March 2000 (aged 87); Auckland, New Zealand
- Occupation: Trade unionist
- Known for: Equal pay and anti-abortion campaigner
- Relatives: Miriam Soljak (mother); Rosanne Meo (niece); Sean Fitzpatrick (great-nephew); Samantha Scott (granddaughter)

Constance Miriam Purdue MBE (née Soljak, 23 May 1912 – 16 March 2000) was a New Zealand trade unionist. Formerly a communist and a Labour Party member, she later became a conservative Catholic and an anti-abortion activist.

== Early life ==
Connie Soljak was the daughter of Miriam Soljak (née Cummings), a New Zealand-born feminist, communist and unemployed rights activist mother of Irish descent, and Peter Soljak, a Croatian gumdigger. They eventually settled in the Auckland suburb of Northcote. Miriam Soljak was one of the founding members of the New Zealand Family Planning Association in 1940. During the 1930s, Purdue was a member of the Young Communists League, sold their newspapers and even distributed material about sex education, before moderating her views on social democracy and industrial relations, and joining the New Zealand Labour Party and the Auckland Clerical Workers Union of which she was a delegate and an organiser. She was elected successfully to the Auckland Hospital Board and appointed to the Accident Compensation Commission.

Purdue had a string of unhappy marriages, each ended by divorce, as she acknowledged herself in her biographical reference for Robyn Rowland's collection of self-descriptions from feminists and anti-feminists in Australia, New Zealand, the United States, Canada and United Kingdom. In her later years, Purdue became celibate. She cherished her grandchildren.

== Pro-life activism ==
While she founded the New Zealand National Organisation for Women, Purdue fell out with many New Zealand feminists when she espoused active anti-abortion views and joined SPUC (the Society for Protection of the Unborn Child). After liberal Catholic novelist Daphne de Jong and others established Feminists for Life in New Zealand, Purdue became an early member. Purdue became increasingly socially conservative from the 1970s onward. In 1983, "Feminists For Life" changed its name to Women for Life, reflecting its change to a socially conservative organisation that opposed feminist social and political reforms, as its original members left. As she aged, she suffered from restricted mobility, abandoned the Labour Party after it embraced pluralism and social liberalism, and joined the New Zealand National Party. This occurred despite the introduction of anti-union legislation, the Employment Contracts Act, in the nineties.

During the 1970s and 1980s, Purdue campaigned against incorporation of feminist objectives within the trade union movement in the Working Women's Charter, attacked Māori moves toward reclamation of their land, language and culture, opposed homosexual law reform, and became involved in an ultimately unsuccessful campaign to prevent New Zealand ratification of the United Nations Convention on the Elimination of All Forms of Discrimination Against Women.

In the 1975 Queen's Birthday Honours, Purdue was appointed a Member of the Order of the British Empire, for community and public services. In 1993, she was awarded the New Zealand Suffrage Centennial Medal.

== Bibliography ==
- "Connie Purdue" in Robyn Rowland (ed) Women Who Do and Women Who Don't Join the Women's Movement: London: Routledge Kegan Paul: 1984: ISBN 0-7102-0296-2
- Lesley Hall: "The Personal is Also Political: The Relationship Between Political Activism and Family Life Among Members of the Communist Party of New Zealand": Oral History in New Zealand: 17: 1–11.
