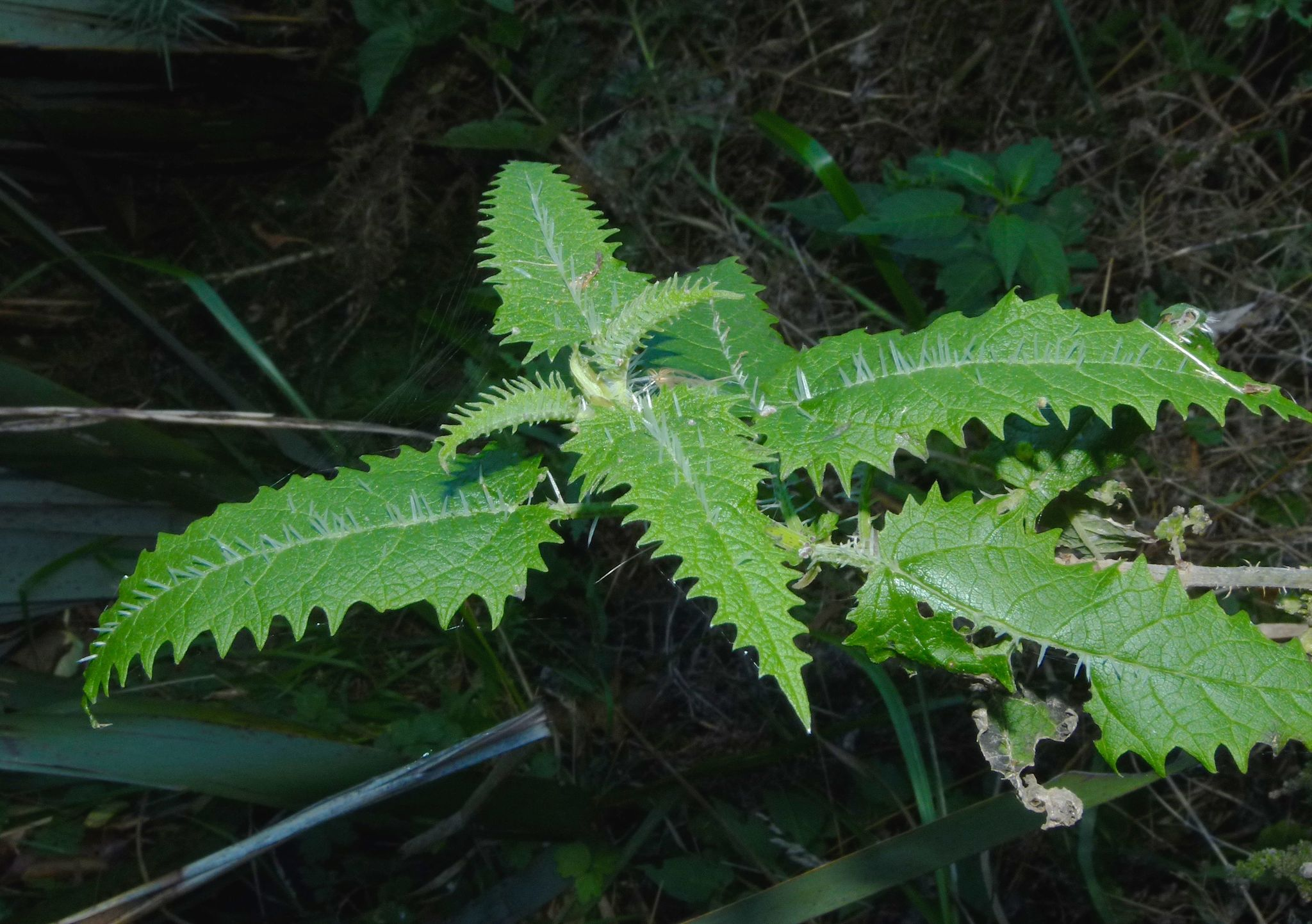
- Leaves and trichomes of U. ferox

Conservation status
- Not Threatened (NZ TCS)

Scientific classification
- Kingdom: Plantae
- Clade: Tracheophytes
- Clade: Angiosperms
- Clade: Eudicots
- Clade: Rosids
- Order: Rosales
- Family: Urticaceae
- Genus: Urtica
- Species: U. ferox

Binomial name
- Urtica ferox G.Forst.

= Urtica ferox =

Species of flowering plant

Urtica ferox, commonly known as tree nettle and ongaonga, is a species of nettle endemic to New Zealand. A member of the Urticaceae, the plant is covered in trichomes (hairs), which contain toxins that are poisonous to humans and other animals. It is a large woody shrub or small tree that can grow to a height of 3 metres (10 feet). Its trichomes can cause painful stings, with effects that can last several days or weeks; the sting is strong enough to kill cattle, dogs, and horses. Two human deaths have been caused by contact with the plant.

The plant was first scientifically described by German naturalist Georg Forster in 1786. U. ferox is wind-pollinated, and its seeds are later dispersed by gravity or the wind. The plant serves as a host for several moth species, and it is the primary source of food for the larvae of the New Zealand red admiral butterfly. Despite being a plant usually avoided by people, U. ferox has some traditional and medicinal uses for the indigenous Māori people. Its 2023 assessment in the New Zealand Threat Classification System was not threatened.

== Description ==
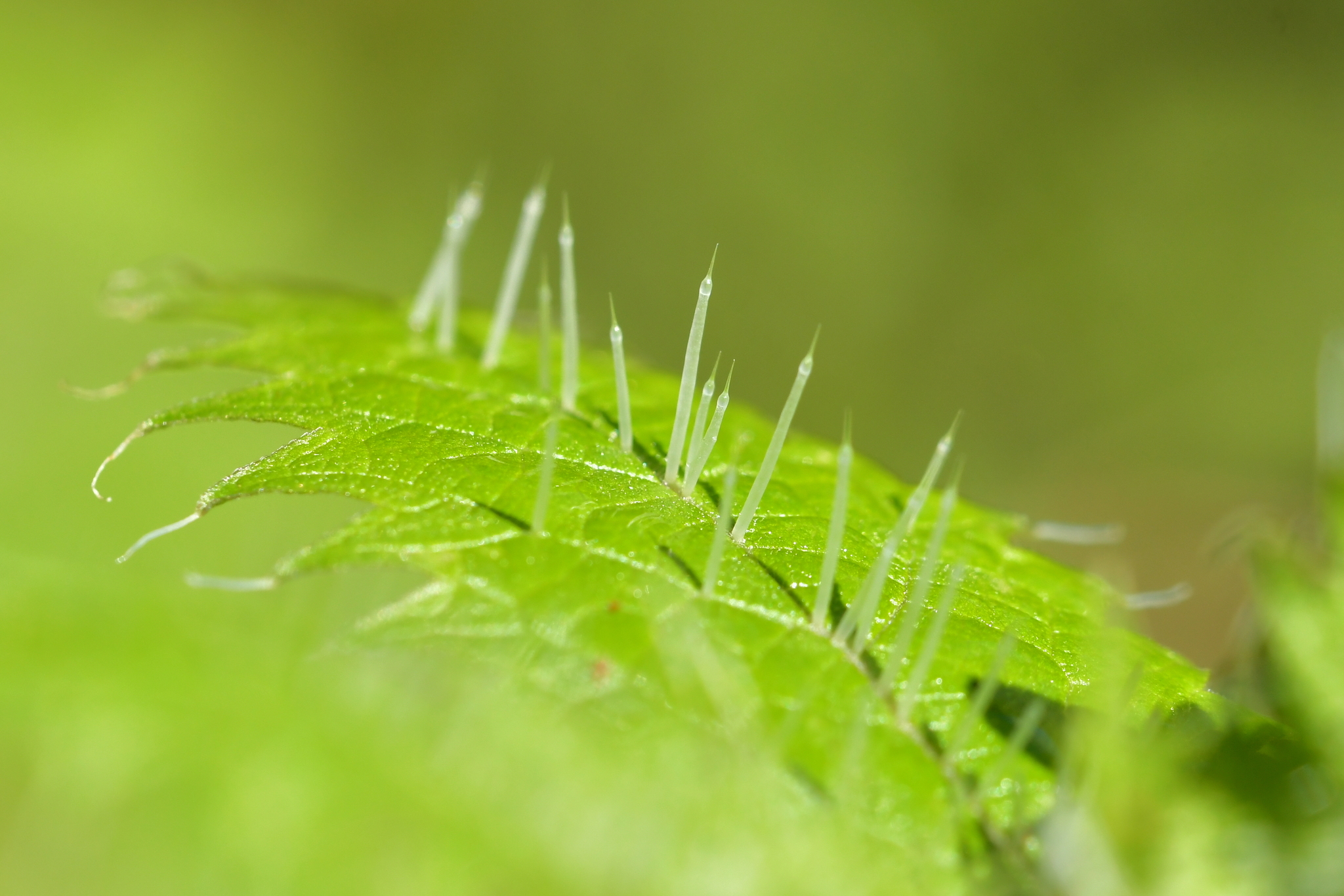
Trichomes along the leaf mid-vein

Trichomes covering the stems

Urtica ferox (tree nettle or ongaonga) is a shrub or small tree in the nettle family Urticaceae. It can grow to a height of 3 metres (10 feet) with the base of the main stem reaching 12 cm (5 in) in thickness. The pale green leaves are thin and membranous, and the surfaces of the leaves, stems, and stalks are covered in stiff trichomes (hairs) that can grow up to 6–10 mm long. These trichomes are prominent along the salient mid-vein and leaf margin. The leaves range in size from 3–5 cm (1.2–2.0 in) in width and 8–12 cm (3.1–4.7 in) in length. They are arranged in opposite pairs. Juvenile leaves can reach up to 15 cm (5.9 in) long. The leaves vary from ovate to triangular or lance-shaped, with coarsely serrated margins. The leaf base is squared-off or nearly heart-shaped.

Flowering occurs from November to March. The flowers are produced in panicles (branched flower clusters), which can reach 8 cm (3.1 in) long. The stigmas in the female flowers receive the pollen grains. Fruiting occurs from December to May; the fruits are found in achenes (dry one-seeded fruits), each containing a single seed, which is 1.5 mm long. These seeds take about one month to germinate. Like European species in the genus Urtica, U. ferox is capable of building up large seed banks (dormant soil seeds) in the soil which may survive for several years. U. ferox has a diploid chromosome count of 48.

== Taxonomy ==
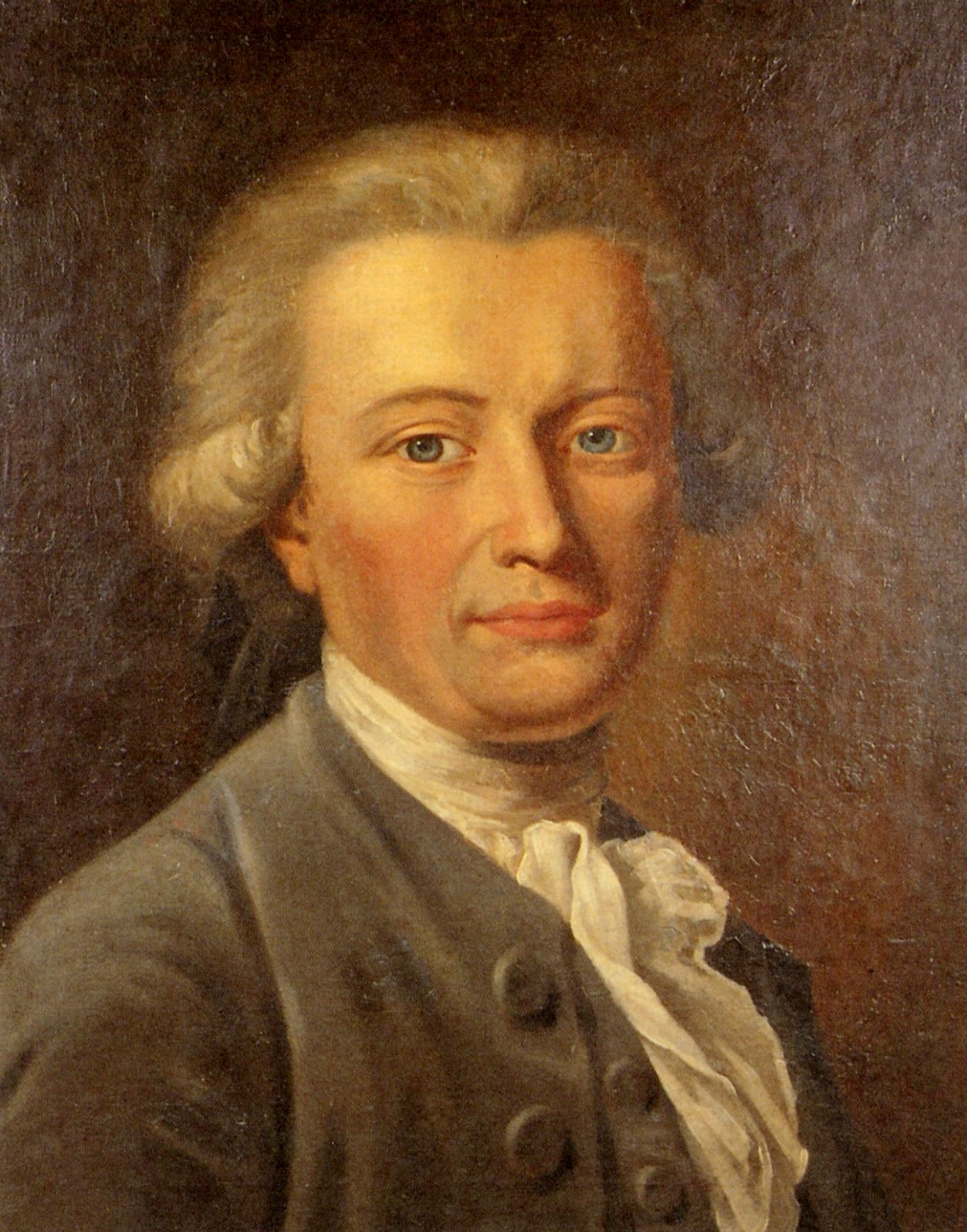
German naturalist Georg Forster first scientifically described the plant in 1786.

Urtica ferox was first scientifically described by German naturalist Georg Forster in 1786. The plant was collected during the second voyage of James Cook. As of 2026 the Plants of the World Online taxonomic database recognises 69 accepted species of Urtica, a genus with a global distribution. Among the six species of Urtica native to New Zealand, U. ferox is unique in its tall, woody growth form.

=== Phylogeny ===
Grosse‐Veldmann et al. (2016) preformed a phylogenetic analysis of the genus Urtica based on gender characteristics and genetic sequencing. The tree showed that U. ferox is not closely related to the other New Zealand native species and is instead the sister species to the smaller South African U. lobulata. It has been hypothesised by several authors that the distinctive morphological evolution and toxicity of U. ferox is a result of the ecological influence of browsing by the now-extinct moa – giant, flightless birds. There is evidence from coprolites, fossilised faeces, and fossilised gizzards that Urtica plants were part of the diet of moa.

=== Etymology ===
The etymology of the genus name Urtica is derived from the Latin word for stinging nettles, which comes from urere, meaning 'to burn'. The specific epithet ferox means 'ferocious', 'savage', or 'wild'. U. ferox is commonly known as tree nettle and ongaonga. In Māori the word ongaonga is used to describe anything 'annoying' or 'irritating'. Cognates (related words) found across different Polynesian languages, including hongohongo and okaoka, are words typically used to describe stinging insects. U. ferox has several recorded Māori names, including houhi, okaoka, puruhi, taraonga, and taraongaonga.

== Ecology ==
Pseudocoremia flava, a rare species of moth which uses U. ferox as a host plant.

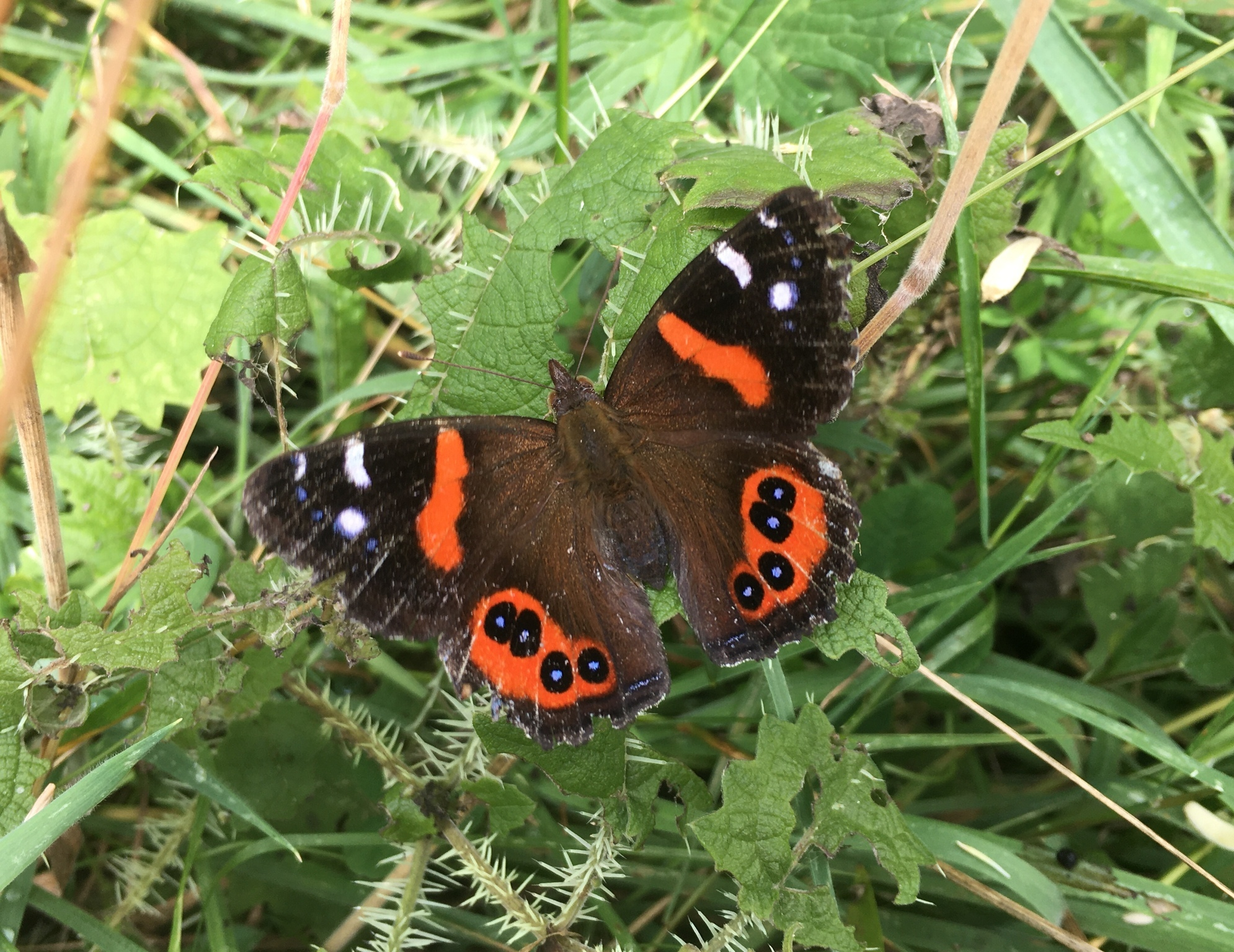
A female New Zealand red admiral (Vanessa gonerilla) laying eggs on U. ferox.

Like all Urtica species, U. ferox is wind-pollinated, although bees may visit the flowers to collect nectar. U. ferox's seeds are dispersed by gravity and the wind. During winter in some southern localities, U. ferox can be semideciduous (losing some of its leaves) or entirely deciduous (losing all of its leaves). This characteristic is uncommon in the native plants of New Zealand.

The plant is the primary host for the larvae of the endemic mainland New Zealand red admiral (Vanessa gonerilla subsp. gonerilla), which begin laying eggs in early spring (September). The butterflies lay their eggs on the new growth of U. ferox leaves, typically at the tip and often on the side with the trichomes. After hatching the caterpillar larvae then spend up to six weeks feeding on those leaves. During this vulnerable stage the caterpillars use the spiny leaves for protection, wrapping the leaves around themselves like a blanket or building a small tent to hide from potential predators such as birds and insects. Populations of V. gonerilla have had a potential decline, possibly in part because of people treating U. ferox as a weed and removing it.

Several moth species feed on the plant as larvae, including Mnesictena flavidalis, Diarsia intermixta, Meterana inchoata, Pasiphila urticae, Epichorista crypsidora, two species of Pseudocoremia, and species of Udea. A rare moth species, Pseudocoremia flava, uses U. ferox as a host plant. The beetle Oemona hirta can also be found on the plant. A species of gall mite, Vittacus mansoni, uses U. ferox as a host plant, and a leaf miner species of fly Liriomyza urticae. Rust fungi of the genus Puccinia and the leaf spot Ramualria urticae can also be present on the plant. Deer, sheep, and goats (all introduced mammal species) eat U. ferox's leaves in spite of the trichomes. The fruits are also eaten by introduced common brushtail possums.

=== Toxins ===
Urtica ferox's trichomes contain the neurotransmitters histamine, serotonin, and acetylcholine. These neurotransmitters have also been found in U. dioica and U. urens. Stings from Urtica species are well known to cause painful skin reactions. A 2022 study in the Journal of Biological Chemistry found that two peptides, Δ-Uf1a and β/δ-Uf2a, are likely responsible for the painful sensations in U. ferox. Δ-Uf1a is suggested to create pain by disturbing cell membranes and β/δ-Uf2a the same by modulating voltage-gated sodium channels. Stings have a painful reaction which causes hives, numbness, and itchiness. In serious cases the stings can also cause ataxia, blurred vision, confusion, polyneuropathy, respiratory distress, and hypersalivation. These sting reactions can last for days to weeks.

Although uncommon the reaction to U. ferox's sting can be fatal, with two recorded human deaths from contact with U. ferox. One death occurred in 1961 when a young hunter died five hours after walking through a patch of U. ferox bushes in the Ruahine Range. In 2002 another young man's death in the Ruahine Range was retrospectively attributed to U. ferox by a pathologist. In one self-experimenting account, the sting of U. ferox was described as producing an immediate burning sensation at the point of contact; the pain subsided after five minutes and was absent after 60 minutes. Paraesthesia, numbness of the skin, was persistent for 18 hours, but subsided after 48 hours. The plant has killed cattle, dogs, and horses in the past.

== Distribution ==
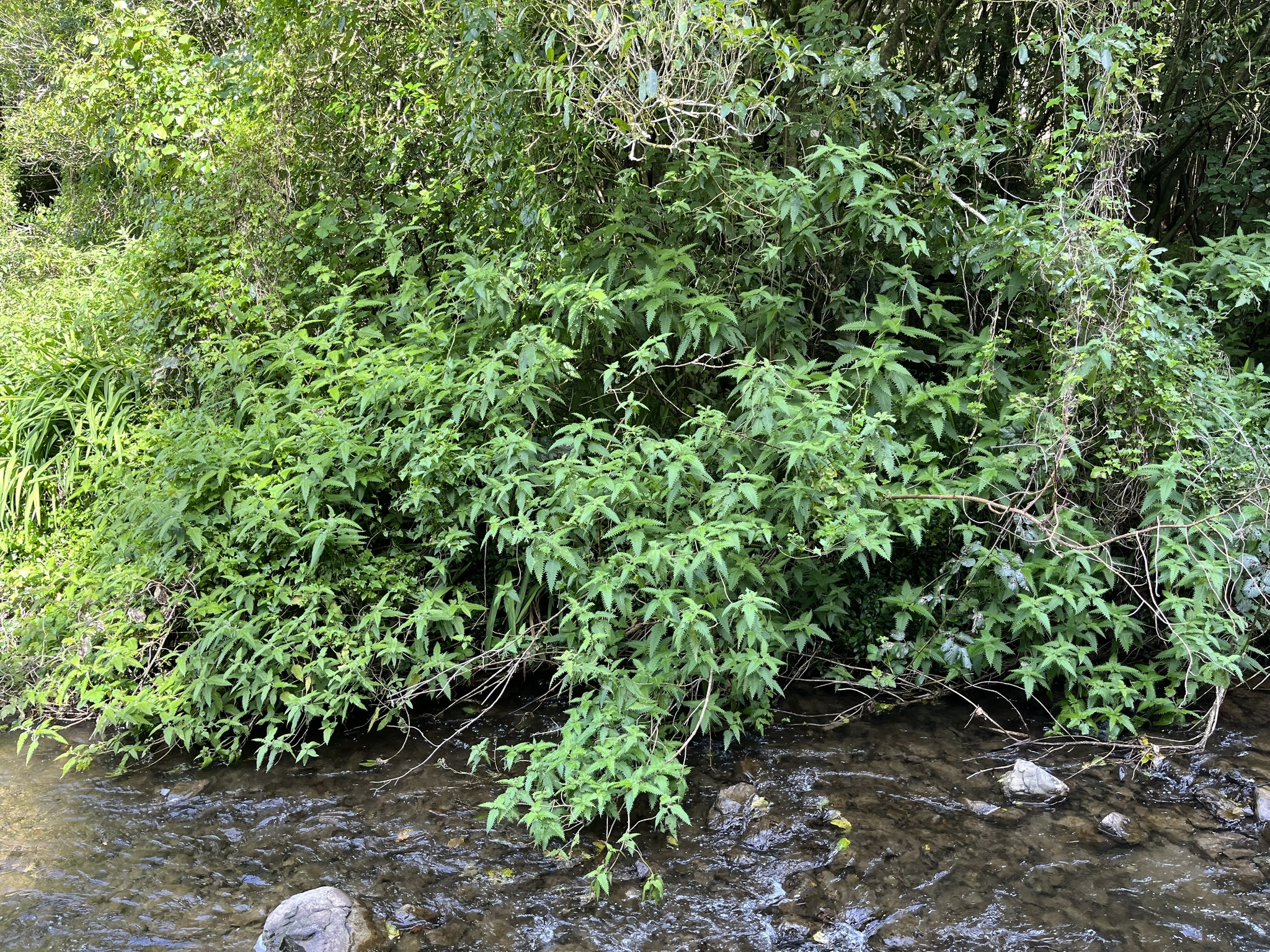
A large U. ferox bush growing next to a stream near Porirua

Urtica ferox is endemic to New Zealand, where it is found throughout the North and South Islands. The southernmost limit of the plant is Stewart Island, according to a 2011 book on the flora of New Zealand. Otago was thought to be the species' southern limit by botanist Thomas Cheeseman in his 1906 publication, the Manual of the New Zealand Flora. It was later recorded on the Tītī / Muttonbird Islands in 1915 by Dugald Poppelwell. The plant varies in abundance throughout its distribution area, being especially common near Wellington and Christchurch, whereas it is uncommon or absent north of Auckland (as noted by botanist Lucy Moore in 1978). The 2023 assessment of U. ferox in the New Zealand Threat Classification System was not threatened, but in the Northland Region, it has been assessed as regionally critical, meaning regionally endangered, with an estimated 250 mature U. ferox plants in the region.

=== Habitat ===
Urtica ferox is typically found in coastal to lowland environments. It is common in forest margins and shrublands and it occurs from sea level to 800–1,000 m (2,600–3,300 ft) above sea level. U. ferox grows on a variety of soil types but prefers fertile, basaltic soils. It also occurs inland, including in the Canterbury Region on the Harper Hills near Glentunnel. The plant can be found on alluvial soils in the Taramakau Valley within Arthurs Pass National Park. U. ferox can also be found growing on the bases of fallen trees and streambeds.

== Uses ==
Urtica ferox is usually avoided by people, but it has had some traditional and medicinal uses for the indigenous Māori people. In traditional medicinal practices, the bark of U. ferox and the leaves of kawakawa (Piper excelsum), boiled together, were used to treat eczema and sexually transmitted infections. The plant was also a traditional Māori food source. The inner stems were consumed after the leaves and outer bark had been removed. The thin film that makes up the inner bark was also eaten raw and had a sweet taste. In Māori mythology the plant was placed in forests to prevent people moving freely and to irritate people. In one legend the Polynesian explorer Kupe is said to have placed several obstacles, including this plant, to slow down those chasing him. In the Māori language ongaonga can be used to describe something annoying, and a frustrating or irritating person can be called he tangata ongaonga, meaning "a prickly person".

== Works cited ==
Books

- Allan, Harry Howard (1961). Flora of New Zealand. Vol. 1. P D Hasselberg Government Printer Publications. ISBN 978-0-477-01056-6 – via the Internet Archive.
- Cheeseman, Thomas Frederick (1906). Manual of the New Zealand flora (1 ed.). New Zealand Board of Science and Art – via the Internet Archive.
- Connor, Henry Eamonn (1977). The Poisonous Plants in New Zealand. New Zealand Department of Scientific and Industrial Research.
- Crowe, Andrew (2009). Which Native Forest Plant?. Penguin Books. ISBN 978-0-14-300901-6.
- Dawson, John; Lucas, Rob; Connor, Jane; Brownsey, P. J. (2019) [2011]. New Zealand's Native Trees. Potton & Burton. ISBN 978-1-877517-01-3.
- Eagle, Audrey (2006). Eagle's Complete Trees and Shrubs of New Zealand. Vol. 1. Te Papa Press. ISBN 0-909010-08-0.
- Forster, Georg; Dietrich, Joann. Christian. (1786). Florulae Insularum Australium: Prodromus Auctore Georgio Forster (in Latin). Joann. Christian Dietrich. doi:10.5962/bhl.title.10725.
- Friis, Ib (1993). "Urticaceae". Flowering Plants · Dicotyledons. Springer Berlin Heidelberg. pp. 612–630. doi:10.1007/978-3-662-02899-5_76. ISBN 978-3-642-08141-5.
- Gibbs, George W. (1980). New Zealand Butterflies: Identification and Natural History. HarperCollins. ISBN 978-0-00-216955-4 – via the Internet Archive.
- Metcalf, Lawrie (2009). Know Your New Zealand Native Plants. White Cloud Books. ISBN 978-1-77694-036-3.
- Moore, Lucy Beatrice (1978). The Oxford Book of New Zealand Plants. Oxford University Press. ISBN 978-0-19-558035-8 – via the Internet Archive.
- Nicolson, Dan Henry; Fosberg, Francis Raymond (2004). The Forsters and the Botany of the Second Cook Expedition: 1772–1775. A.R.G. Gantner Verl. ISBN 3-906166-02-3.
- Salmon, John Tenison (1986). The Native Trees of New Zealand. Raupo. ISBN 978-0-7900-0104-3 – via the Internet Archive.
- Vennell, Robert (2019). The Meaning of Trees. HarperCollins. ISBN 978-1-77554-130-1.

Journals

- Barron, M. C.; Barlow, N. D.; Wratten, S. D. (2003). "Non-Target Parasitism of the Endemic New Zealand Red Admiral Butterfly (Bassaris gonerilla) by the Introduced Biological Control Agent Pteromalus puparum". Biological Control. 27 (3). Elsevier BV: 329–335. doi:10.1016/s1049-9644(03)00028-8. ISSN 1049-9644.
- Best, Elsdon (1902). "Art. V.— Food Products of Tuhoeland: Being Notes on the Food-supplies of a Non-agricultural Tribe of the Natives of New Zealand; Together With Some Account of Various Customs, Superstitions, &c., Pertaininy to Foods". Transactions and Proceedings of the Royal Society of New Zealand. 35.
- Braun, U.; Hill, C. F. (2004). "Some New Cercosporoid and Related Leaf Spot Diseases from New Zealand and Fiji". Australasian Plant Pathology. 33 (4): 485. doi:10.1071/AP04052. ISSN 0815-3191.
- Brooker, S. G.; Cooper, R. C. (1961). "New Zealand Medicinal Plants". Economic Botany. 15 (1). New York Botanical Garden Press: 1–10. ISSN 0013-0001. JSTOR 4252212.
- Burrows, Colin J. (1994). "Fruit Types and Seed Dispersal Modes of Woody Plants in Ahuriri Summit Bush, Port Hills, Western Banks Peninsula, Canterbury, New Zealand". New Zealand Journal of Botany. 32 (2): 169–181. doi:10.1080/0028825X.1994.10410366. ISSN 0028-825X.
- Burrows, Colin J. (1996). "Germination Behaviour of Seeds of the New Zealand Woody Species Melicope simplex, Myoporum laetum, Myrsine divaricata, and Urtica ferox". New Zealand Journal of Botany. 34 (2): 205–213. doi:10.1080/0028825X.1996.10410685. ISSN 0028-825X.
- Burrows, Colin J. (1999). "Observations on Ongaonga Urtica ferox". Canterbury Botanical Society Journal. 33: 99–100. Archived from the original on 13 February 2023.
- Butz Huryn, Vivian M. (1995). "Use of Native New Zealand Plants by Honey Bees (Apis mellifera L.): A review". New Zealand Journal of Botany. 33 (4): 497–512. doi:10.1080/0028825X.1995.10410621. ISSN 0028-825X.
- Chambers, F. D. (1977). "Records of Rare or Little-Known Moths". New Zealand Entomologist. 6 (3): 326–326. doi:10.1080/00779962.1977.9722280. ISSN 0077-9962.
- Cowan, P. E. (1990). "Fruits, Seeds, and Flowers in the Diet of Brushtail Possums, Trichosurus vulpecula, in Lowland Podocarp/Mixed Hardwood Forest, Orongorongo Valley, New Zealand". New Zealand Journal of Zoology. 17 (4): 549–566. doi:10.1080/03014223.1990.10422953. ISSN 0301-4223.
- Cranwell, Lucy May; Moore, Lucy Beatrice (1935). "Botanical Notes on the Hen and Chickens Islands". Records of the Auckland Institute and Museum. 1 (6). Auckland War Memorial Museum: 301–318. ISSN 0067-0464. JSTOR 42905959.
- Grosse-Veldmann, Bernadette; Nürk, Nicolai M.; Smissen, Rob; Breitwieser, Ilse; Quandt, Dietmar; Weigend, Maximilian (2016). "Pulling the Sting Out of Nettle Systematics – A Comprehensive Phylogeny of the Genus Urtica L. (Urticaceae)". Molecular Phylogenetics and Evolution. 102. Elsevier BV: 9–19. doi:10.1016/j.ympev.2016.05.019. ISSN 1055-7903.
- Grosse-Veldmann, Bernadette; Conn, Barry J.; Weigend, Maximilian (2016). "Weeding the Nettles IV: A Redefinition of Urtica incisa and Allies in New Zealand and Australia, Including the Segregation of Two New Species Urtica sykesii and U. perconfusa". Phytotaxa. 245 (4): 251. Bibcode:2016Phytx.245..251G. doi:10.11646/phytotaxa.245.4.2. ISSN 1179-3163.
- Grosse‐Veldmann, Bernadette; Weigend, Maximilian (2018). "The Geometry of Gender: Hyper‐Diversification of Sexual Systems in Urtica L. (Urticaceae)". Cladistics. 34 (2): 1–20. doi:10.1111/cla.12193. ISSN 0748-3007.
- Hammond‐Tooke, Graeme D.; Taylor, Peter; Punchihewa, Saman; Beasley, Michael (2007). "Urtica ferox Neuropathy". Muscle & Nerve. 35 (6): 804–807. doi:10.1002/mus.20730. ISSN 0148-639X.
- Kanzaki, Mami; Tsuchihara, Toyokazu; McMorran, Denise; Taylor, Peter; Hammond-Tooke, Graeme D. (2010). "A Rat Model of Urtica ferox neuropathy". NeuroToxicology. 31 (6): 709–714. doi:10.1016/j.neuro.2010.07.004.
- Marrassini, Carla; Acevedo, Cristina; Miño, Jorge; Ferraro, Graciela; Gorzalczany, Susana (2010). "Evaluation of Antinociceptive, Antinflammatory Activities and Phytochemical Analysis of Aerial Parts of Urtica urens L.". Phytotherapy Research. 24 (12): 1807–1812. doi:10.1002/ptr.3188. ISSN 0951-418X.
- McGlone, Matt S.; Dungan, Roger J.; Hall, Graeme M. J.; Allen, Robert B. (2004). "Winter Leaf Loss in the New Zealand Woody Flora". New Zealand Journal of Botany. 42 (1): 1–19. doi:10.1080/0028825X.2004.9512887. ISSN 0028-825X.
- McKenzie, Eric H. C.; Pennycook, Shaun R.; Padamsee, Mahajabeen (2024). "New Species, Names, and Type Designation of Rust Fungi from New Zealand". New Zealand Journal of Botany. 62 (2–3): 367–425. doi:10.1080/0028825X.2024.2353915. ISSN 0028-825X.
- Parkes, John; Murphy, Elaine (2003). "Management of Introduced Mammals in New Zealand". New Zealand Journal of Zoology. 30 (4): 335–359. doi:10.1080/03014223.2003.9518346. ISSN 0301-4223.
- Parry, Gareth J.; Buenz, Eric J. (2018). "Adventures in Self Experimentation". The BMJ: 363. doi:10.1136/bmj.k5006. ISSN 0959-8138.
- Patrick, Brian H. (2021). "Indigenous Hostplants of New Zealand's Endemic Lepidoptera". Canterbury Botanical Society. 52: 4–28.
- Sanger, Greer J.; Lord, Janice M.; Jandt, Jennifer M. (2025). "Preference and Performance of Pūrerehua Kahukura (Vanessa gonerilla gonerilla) on Native and Introduced Nettles of Aotearoa". New Zealand Journal of Ecology. 49 (1). New Zealand Ecological Society: 1–12. ISSN 0110-6465. JSTOR 48855037.
- Sopow, Stephanie L.; Bain, John (3 July 2017). "A Checklist of New Zealand Cerambycidae (Insecta: Coleoptera), Excluding Lamiinae". New Zealand Entomologist. 40 (2): 55–71. doi:10.1080/00779962.2017.1357423. ISSN 0077-9962.
- Spencer, Kenneth A. (1976). "The Agromyzidae of New Zealand (Insecta: Diptera)". Journal of the Royal Society of New Zealand. 6 (2): 153–211. doi:10.1080/03036758.1976.10421470. ISSN 0303-6758.
- Wardle, Peter (1978). "Seasonality in New Zealand Plants". New Zealand Entomologist. 6 (4): 344–349. doi:10.1080/00779962.1978.9722285. ISSN 0077-9962.
- Xie, Jing; Robinson, Samuel D.; Gilding, Edward K.; Jami, Sina; Deuis, Jennifer R.; Rehm, Fabian B.H.; Yap, Kuok; Ragnarsson, Lotten; Chan, Lai Yue; Hamilton, Brett R.; Harvey, Peta J.; Craik, David J.; Vetter, Irina; Durek, Thomas (2022). "Neurotoxic and Cytotoxic Peptides Underlie the Painful Stings of the Tree Nettle Urtica ferox". Journal of Biological Chemistry. 298 (8): 1–12. doi:10.1016/j.jbc.2022.102218.
- Xue, Xaio-Feng; Song, Zi-Wie; Hong, Xiao-Yue (2005). "A New Species of Vittacus Keifer (Acari: Eriophyidae: Phyllocoptinae) from Qinling Area, Shaanxi Province, China". Zootaxa. 992 (1). Magnolia Press. doi:10.11646/zootaxa.992.1.1. ISSN 1175-5334.

Websites

- De Lange, Peter (2026). "Urtica ferox". New Zealand Plant Conservation Network. Archived from the original on 28 November 2025.
- Ford, Marley; Cameron, Ewen; Champion, Paul; De Lange, Peter; Forester, Lisa (6 July 2026). "Conservation Status of Indigenous Vascular Plants in Northland 2026". Northland Regional Council.
- Poppelwell, D. L. (7 September 1915). "Notes on the Plant-Covering of Pukeokaoka, Stewart Island". Transactions and Proceedings of the Royal Society of New Zealand. Vol. 48. p. 244 – via Papers Past.
- Wassilieff, Maggy (1 March 2009). "Poisonous plants and fungi – Poisonous native plants". Te Ara: The Encyclopedia of New Zealand. Archived from the original on 12 April 2026.
- "Urtica L." Plants of the World Online. Archived from the original on 12 November 2025 – via Royal Botanic Gardens, Kew.
- "Urtica ferox G.Forst., Fl. Ins. Austr. 66 (1786)". The Royal Botanic Gardens, Kew, Harvard University Herbaria & Libraries and Australian National Herbarium. International Plant Names Index. 2026. Archived from the original on 2 February 2025.
- "Ngā Rauropi Whakaoranga — Urtica ferox. Ongaonga. Tree nettle". Manaaki Whenua – Landcare Research. 2021. Archived from the original on 30 January 2025.
- "Jason Chase death: Pathologist solves cause of death after chance encounter". The New Zealand Herald. 12 July 2020. Archived from the original on 4 July 2025.
- "Urtica ferox". New Zealand Threat Classification System. Archived from the original on 11 December 2024.
