= Rosanne Meo =

New Zealand businesswoman

Dame Rosanne Meo DNZM OBE
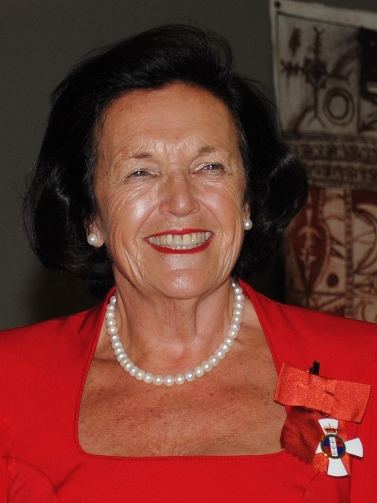
- Meo in 2012
- Born: Rosanne Philippa O'Loghlen; 1946 (age 79–80)
- Education: Baradene College of the Sacred Heart
- Occupation: Businesswoman
- Relatives: Brian Fitzpatrick (brother-in-law); Sean Fitzpatrick (nephew); Connie Purdue (aunt); Miriam Soljak (grandmother)

Dame Rosanne Philippa Meo DNZM OBE (née O'Loghlen; born 1946) is a New Zealand businesswoman based in Auckland.

== Early life and family ==
Born in 1946, Meo was educated at Baradene College of the Sacred Heart, Auckland. She has two daughters and was divorced in the early 1990s. She is the aunt of former All Blacks captain, Sean Fitzpatrick.

== Business career ==
In 1991, Meo was appointed president of the Employers' Federation, becoming the first woman to serve in the role. She sits or has sat on the boards of NZ Forest Products, Television New Zealand, Mercury Energy, Sky TV, Ports of Auckland, and Baycorp.

Meo has also been involved in community and non-profit organisations, including the Kelliher Charitable Trust and the Auckland Philharmonic Orchestra.

== Honours and awards ==
In the 1993 Queen's Birthday Honours, Meo was appointed an Officer of the Order of the British Empire, for services to business management. Also in 1993, she was awarded the New Zealand Suffrage Centennial Medal.

Meo was appointed a Dame Companion of the New Zealand Order of Merit, for services to business, in the 2012 New Year Honours.

In 2016, Meo received the New Zealand Women of Influence Award for lifetime achievement.
