= Hillsborough Cemetery =

Cemetery in Auckland, New Zealand

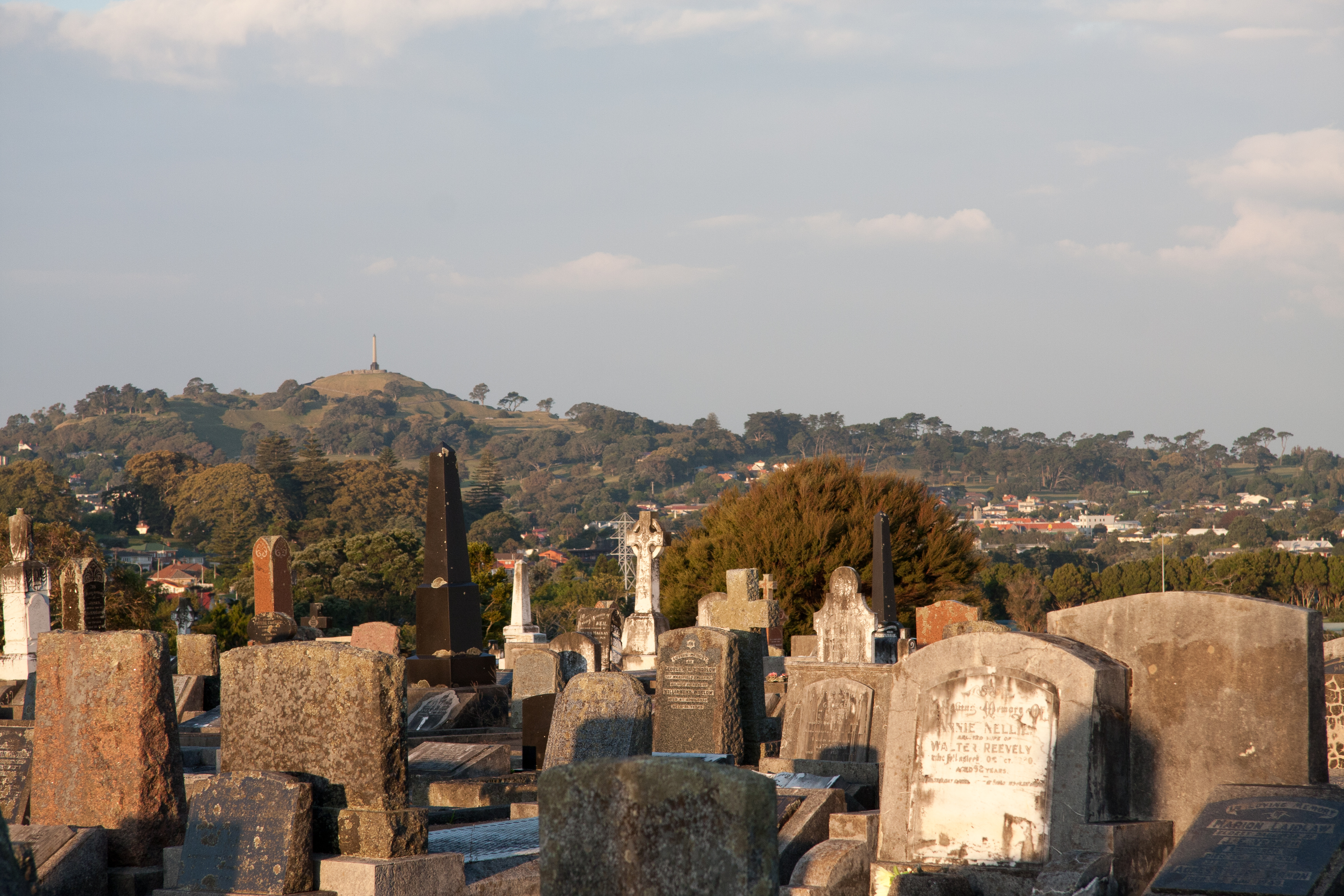
- View of Maungakiekie / One Tree Hill from Hillsborough Cemetery
- Interactive map of Hillsborough Cemetery

Details
- Established: 1916
- Location: Hillsborough, Auckland
- Country: New Zealand
- Coordinates: 36.926027°S 174.751977°E
- No. of graves: 18,000+
- Find a Grave: Hillsborough Cemetery

Hillsborough Cemetery is a large cemetery located in the Auckland isthmus suburb of Hillsborough.

== Location ==
The cemetery lies on a ridge at the south of the Auckland isthmus, overlooking the Manukau Harbour. The cemetery is split in two by a large forested valley, adjacent to the Hillsborough Reserve. Erosion is a problem for the cemetery, due to its hillside location. The cemetery is a part of the Waikōwhai Walkway, which extends for 10 km (6.2 mi) linking Onehunga to Lynfield Cove. Road access is by Clifton Road, off Hillsborough Road, Route 15.

== History ==
Hillsborough Cemetery is one of the older cemeteries in the Auckland Region. It was purchased by the Onehunga Borough Council and established in 1916, to provide more space for burials as Waikaraka Cemetery, closer to Onehunga, no longer had available space. During the first six years of operation, very few burials were undertaken at the cemetery, primarily of paupers along the eastern section along Goodall Street. Onehunga Borough Council advertised for a caretaker for Hillsborough Cemetery in 1917, when Waikaraka Cemetery was nearly full. Agreement was reached with Mount Roskill Road Board about access, though further discussed in 1923 and 1935.

The cemetery was primarily in use between 1916 and 1976, and it served as an administration hub for the cemeteries of the area, and people were able to reach the cemetery through a bus service, which stopped within the cemetery. The cemetery features sections for three religious orders: St Mary's of Ponsonby, Little Sisters of the Poor (also of Ponsonby) and the Sisters of the Good Shepherd, of Waikōwhai.

The final plots in the cemetery were sold in 1974, however burials have continued in the reserved plots.

== Burials ==
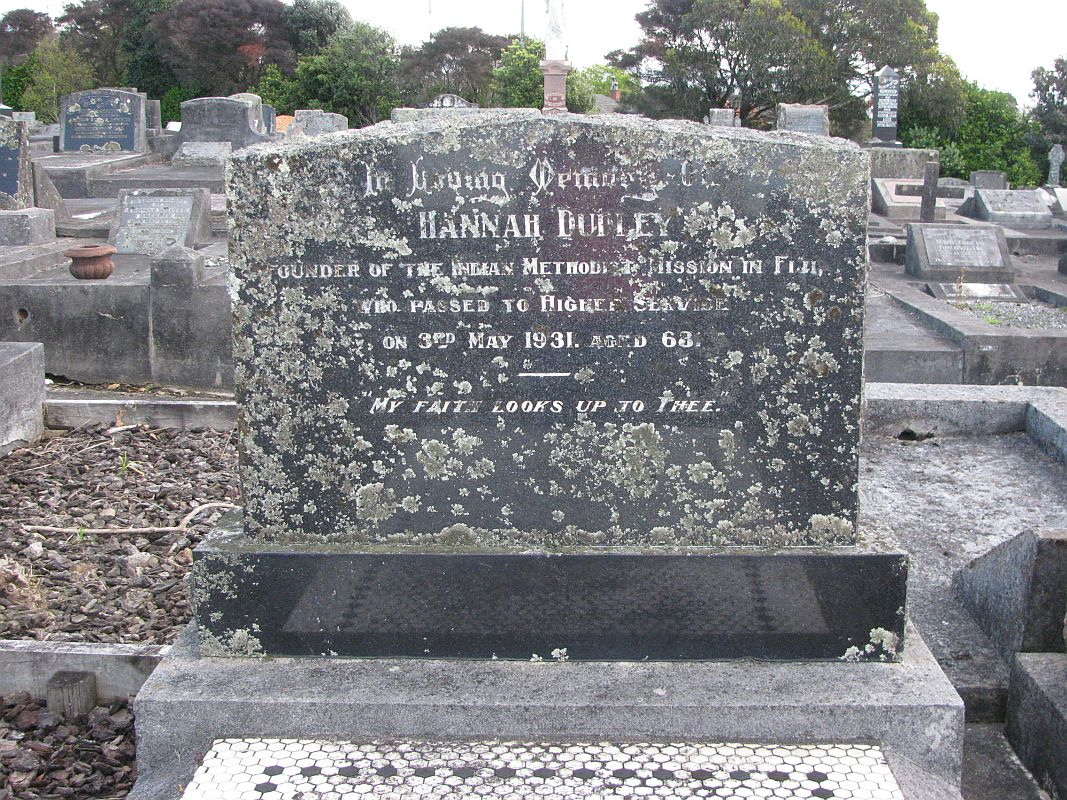
Gravestone of Hannah Dudley

Some of the notable people buried at the cemetery include:

- Bessie Blomfield (1880–1984), New Zealand artist known as Elizabeth Kendon, and daughter of Charles Blomfield
- Charles Blomfield (1848–1926), New Zealand artist
- James Bradney (1853–1936), New Zealand politician
- Bill Cunningham (1874–1927), New Zealand rugby union player
- Hannah Dudley (1862–1931), Australian missionary to Suva
- Emily Patricia Gibson (1864-1947), Auckland feminist, socialist and proofreader
- Edith Searle Grossmann (1863–1931), New Zealand teacher and novelist
- Richard Henry (1845–1929), New Zealand conservationist
- Henry Kelliher (1896–1991), New Zealand businessman
- Bobby Leach (1858–1926), the second person to go over the Niagara Falls
- Nisbet McRobie (1872–1929), New Zealand rugby union player, master printer, newspaper proprietor, and politician.
- William Joseph Napier (1857–1925), New Zealand politician
- Annette Paul (1863–1952), New Zealand salvation army officer
- Margaret Beveridge Stevenson (1865–1941), New Zealand Baháʼí follower

== See also ==
- List of cemeteries in New Zealand
