= Annette Paul =

New Zealand Salvation Army officer

Annette Paul (1863–1952) was a New Zealand salvation army officer. She was born in Auckland, New Zealand in 1863. She was buried at Hillsborough Cemetery.
