= Hannah Dudley =

Australian Methodist missionary (1862–1931)

Hannah Dudley (1862–1931) was a Methodist mission sister who worked amongst Indo-Fijians in the Suva area of Fiji for 13 years.

== Family background ==
Hannah Dudley was born on 11 July 1862 in Morpeth, New South Wales, Australia. She was the daughter of Hannah (née Brereton) and Charles Dudley who immigratedfrom the United Kingdom to Australia as single assisted immigrants, arriving on 12 February 1849. Hannah Brereton and Charles Dudley married soon after arriving in Australia. Hannah and Charles had eight children, with four living to adulthood.

== Mission sister in India ==
Dudley was a teacher in New South Wales before joining the British Methodist Missionary Society as a mission sister in India where she became conversant in Tamil and Urdu. After six years her health broke down, and she returned to Australia for medical treatment and was refused permission to serve in India again on medical grounds.

== Fiji ==
In February 1897 at the Conference for Overseas Missions, Dudley heard of the need for a mission sister for working with Indians in Fiji. She offered her services and with her knowledge of Urdu was accepted. Women's organisations linked to the Methodist Church in Australia raised funds for her trip and she arrived in Suva in September 1897. She found a room with a verandah in the Indian quarter.

She established the first school for Indian children in Suva on her verandah, where she taught Urdu and English to 40 children. On Wednesday nights she held a class for Christian instruction and on Sundays she held services on her verandah. On Sundays she also walked three miles to the local gaol to speak to 400 prisoners and pray with condemned prisoners about to be hanged. Initially, she was paid only £50 p.a. and this was raised to £75 p.a. in 1899. With this money she supported herself and later five children as well. In 1900, her widowed mother and sister Lilly Dudle, came to live with her and assist her in her work. Lilly taught music in Suva to earn money to support the Dudley family and the mission.

Erection of two native school buildings at Nausori and Davuilevu were authorised and she was allowed to use the Jubilee Church for her day classes and for her Indian services on Sundays. She wanted a wooden church and collected money to have one built and it dedicated on 19 December 1901 at the site of the present Dudley High School, called the Indian Mission Hall.

During her first year in Fiji, she began adopting orphans. She started with two girls and a boy but soon the number of adopted children had grown to eleven. One boy given to Dudley for adoption by his father when the mother deserted him. He took his foster-mother's name and became Raymond Dudley, later the president of the New Zealand Methodist Conference in 1956. As her adopted family grew, the Church decided to build an orphanage for her at Davuilevu but she refused to move there. In 1904 an orphanage was built at Davuilevu, called The Dudley Orphanage for Indian Children.

On 26 July 1905, she left for Bengal to join the Faith Mission, taking the children with her under her own name. She returned to Suva in July 1908. Two of the children that she had taken with her had died in India.

== Later years ==
She tried to have the indenture system abolished. She left Fiji in August 1913 because of illness, taking five girls and young Raymond with her. Australian immigration laws forced her to move with her children to Auckland. In 1924, she again offered to return to Fiji but her offer was declined because of her age and her independent habits. She died in Auckland on 3 May 1931 at the age of 68, and was buried at Hillsborough Cemetery.

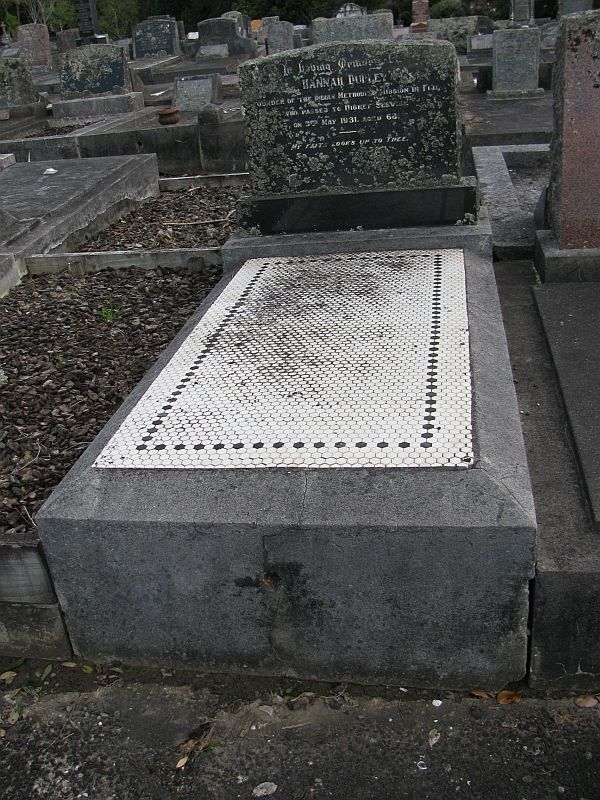
Dudley's grave

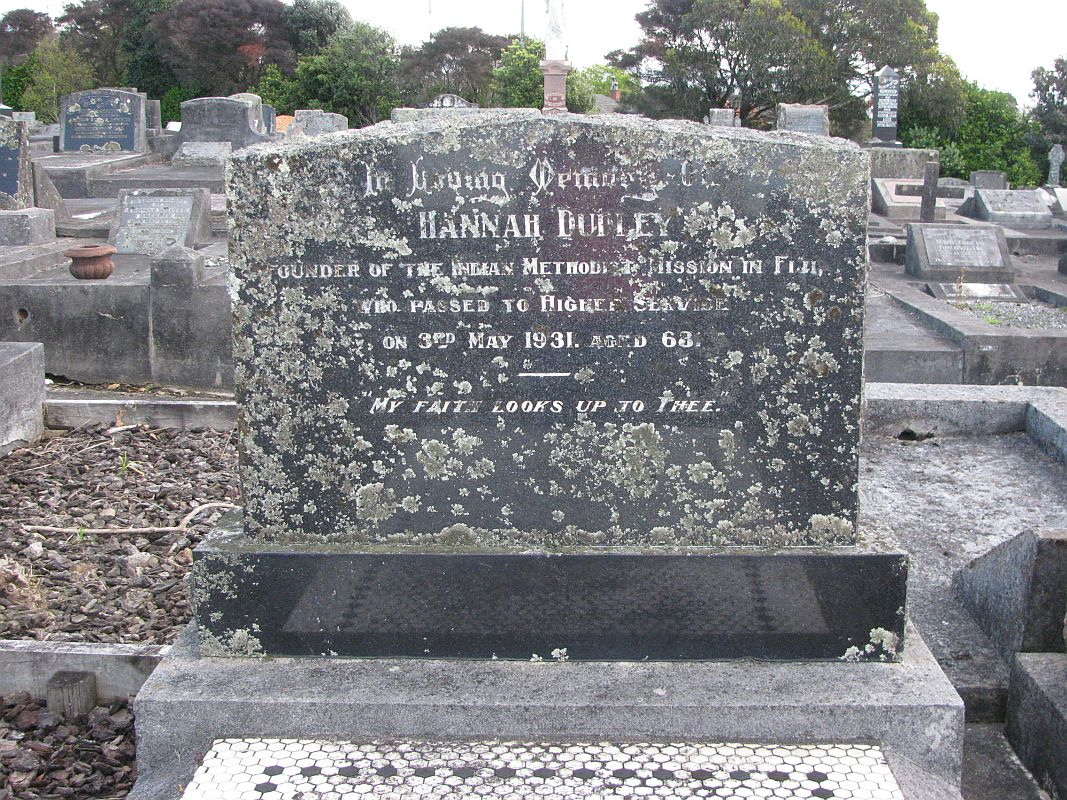
Dudley's headstone

== See also ==
- Methodist Church of Fiji and Rotuma
