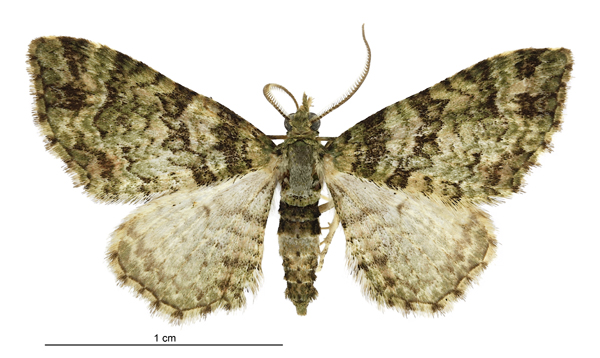
- Male
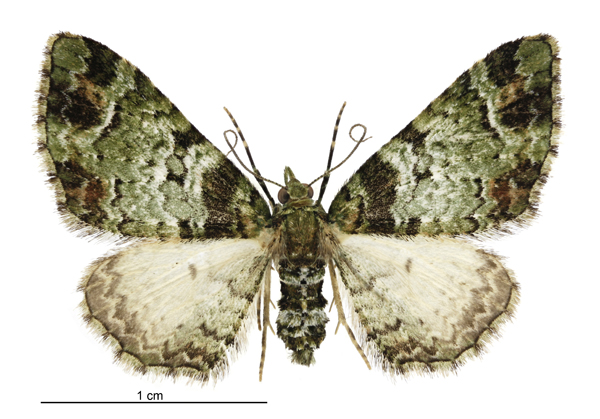
- Female

Scientific classification
- Kingdom: Animalia
- Phylum: Arthropoda
- Class: Insecta
- Order: Lepidoptera
- Family: Geometridae
- Genus: Pasiphila
- Species: P. urticae

Binomial name
- Pasiphila urticae (Hudson, 1939)

Synonyms
- Chloroclystis urticae Hudson, 1939

= Pasiphila urticae =

Species of moth endemic to New Zealand

Pasiphila urticae is a moth of the family Geometridae. This species was first described in 1939 by George Hudson. It is endemic to New Zealand and is found on both the North and South Islands. The larvae of this species feed on new leaves of Urtica ferox. Larvae of P. urticae are well camouflaged and behave sluggishly. They pupate underground with the adults being observed commonly in November.

== Taxonomy ==
This species was first described in 1939 by George Hudson and originally named Chloroclystis urticae. In 1971 John S. Dugdale placed this species in the genus Pasiphila. The male lectotype, bred by Hudson in South Karori from larva taken on nettle, is held at the Te Papa.

== Description ==
Hudson described the adults of this species as follows:

The expansion of the wings is about 7/8 inch (21-24 mm.). Extremely similar to Chloroclystis paralodes, but generally speaking less brilliant, less green, and often very slightly suffused with grey, giving the insect a dusky appearance. Mr. Prout has very kindly pointed out to me that on the underside of the fore-wings the anterior portion is largely tinged with green (in paralodes more or less pink, with no suspicion of green), and that on the upperside of fore-wings the outer margin of the median band (second line) is more perpendicular to costa than in paralodes.

Hudson explains that these differences would not normally be significant enough to require specific separation but that the larvae of the two species, Pasiphila urticae and Pasiphila paralodes are so distinct that he was of the opinion this was required.

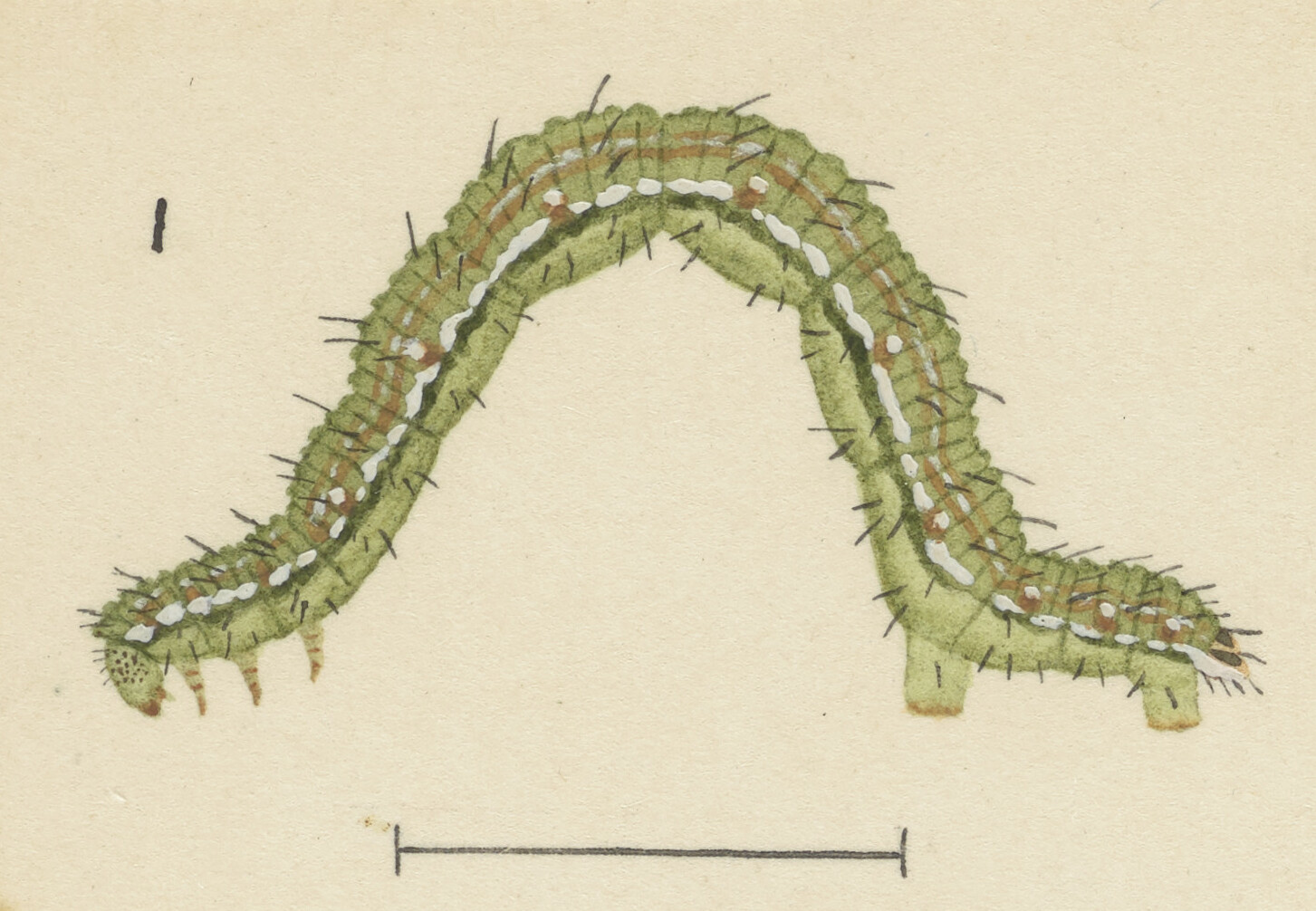
Illustration of larva.

Hudson went on to described the larvae of P. urticae as follows:

The length of the full-grown larva is about 3/4 inch (17 mm.). Moderately stout, cylindrical, considerably flattened, slightly tapering at each extremity. Head yellowish-green, speckled with pale brown. Body bright green; a prominent dark green lateral line and ridge interruptedly edged with white above; a fine, straight, brownish-green dorsal line; a double, very wavy, brownish-green subdorsal line, the dorsal and subdorsal lines sometimes rather obscure; a lateral series of small whitish dots; the dorsal region of the whole larva is strongly wrinkled transversely; other warts blackish, each emitting a short curved black bristle, the bristles curved forwards anteriorly and backwards posteriorly. Anal flap pinkish-brown, bordered with dull white. Younger larvae may be greenish-white, very faintly mottled with pink on the sides, but the black bristles are always distinctive.

Hudson explained that black bristles on the larvae of P. urticae are diagnostic as there are no black bristles on the larvae of P. paralodes.

== Distribution ==
This species is endemic to New Zealand and is found on both the North and South Islands.

== Habitat and hosts ==
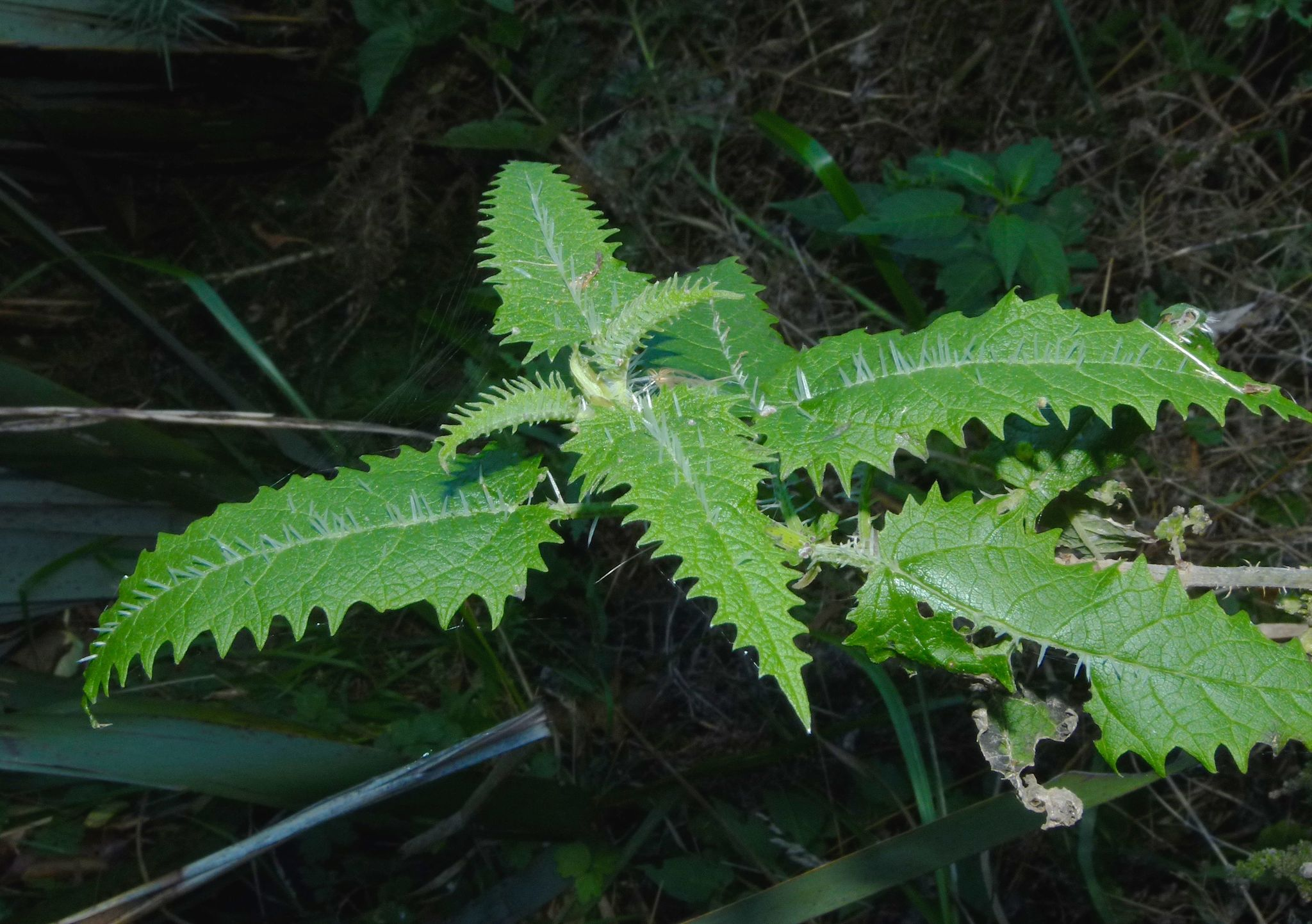
Larval host plant.

The larvae feed on the new leaves of Urtica ferox.

== Behaviour ==
Hudson described the larvae as being sluggish and well camouflaged. P. urticae pupates underground with the pupa being enclosed in a cocoon created out of silk and soil. Pupa can be found at approximately 3/4 inch below the surface. Adults most commonly observed are on the wing in November.
