= Sean Fitzpatrick =

NZ international rugby union player

Sean Fitzpatrick ONZM
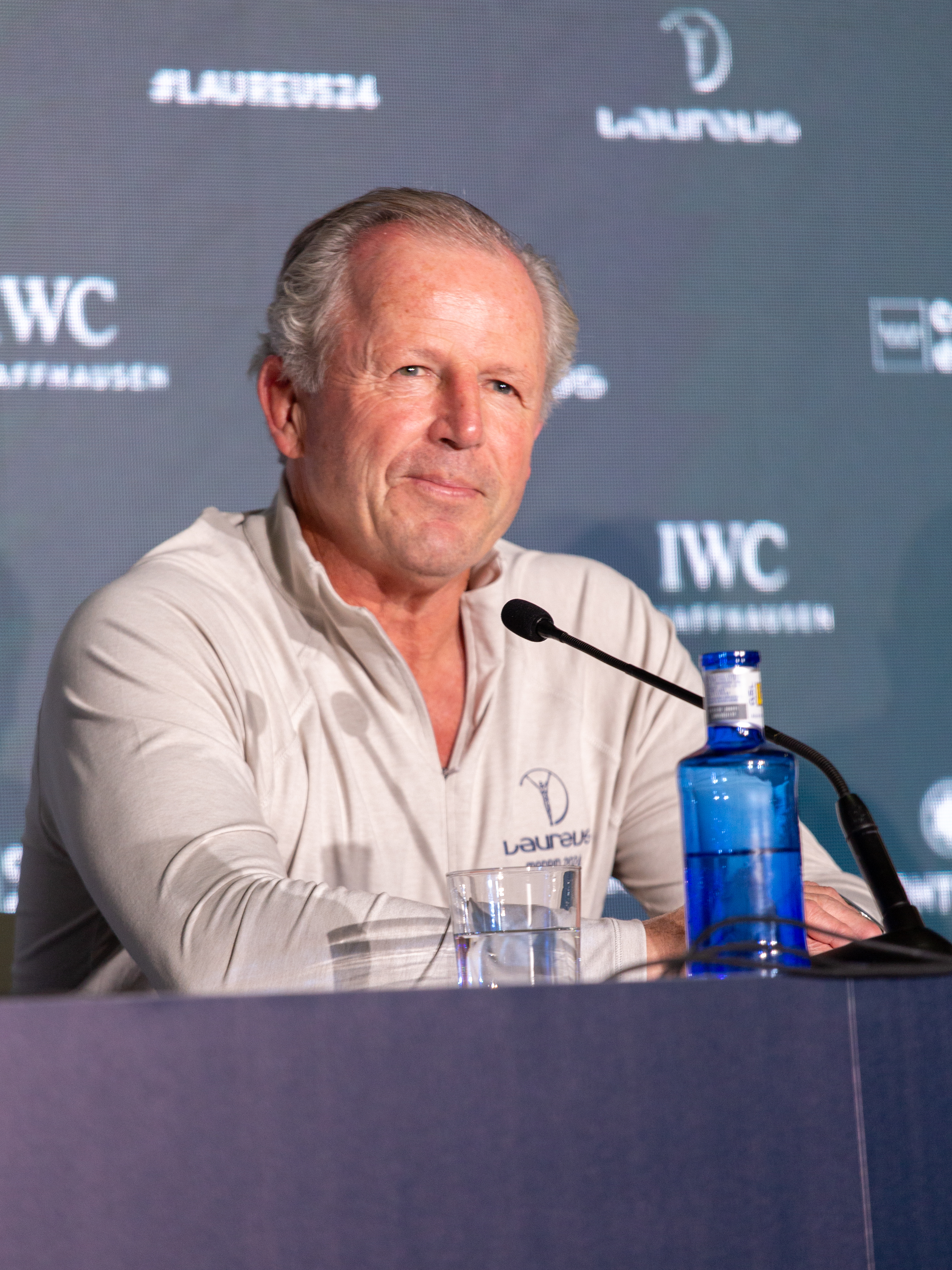
- Fitzpatrick in 2024
- Born: Sean Brian Thomas Fitzpatrick; 4 June 1963 (age 63) Auckland, New Zealand
- Height: 1.83 m (6 ft 0 in)
- Weight: 105 kg (16 st 7 lb)
- School: Sacred Heart College
- Notable relative(s): Brian Fitzpatrick (father); Rosanne Meo (aunt); Connie Purdue (great-aunt); Miriam Soljak (great-grandmother)

Rugby union career
- Position: Hooker
Provincial / State sides
Years	Team	Apps	(Points)
1986–1997	Auckland	127	(60)
Super Rugby
Years	Team	Apps	(Points)
1996–1997	Auckland Blues	25	(10)
International career
Years	Team	Apps	(Points)
1986–1997	New Zealand	92	(60)

Sean Brian Thomas Fitzpatrick (born 4 June 1963) is a New Zealand former rugby union player.

He played for the dominant Auckland team in the late 1980s and 1990s, and won the first two Super 12 titles with the Auckland Blues in 1996 and 1997.

He made his debut for the New Zealand national team (the All Blacks) in 1986, and went on to win 92 international caps. He was part of the New Zealand side that won the first Rugby World Cup in 1987. He captained New Zealand from 1992 until his retirement in 1997, winning a grim test series against the British Lions in 1993, reaching and losing the 1995 World Cup final, and winning a series in South Africa in 1996.

== Early life and family ==
Fitzpatrick was born in Auckland on 4 June 1963, the son of Brian Fitzpatrick, also a New Zealand international player. He is the nephew of Rosanne Meo and the great-grandson of Miriam Soljak. Fitzpatrick's high school education was at Sacred Heart College, Auckland. As a primary school student he attended at Mt Carmel Primary (Auckland).

== Early rugby career ==
A product of the powerful Auckland provincial side, Fitzpatrick made his international debut as one of the "Baby Blacks" in the 1986 Test series in France. Although most of the regular starting fifteen for New Zealand had been suspended following the unauthorised New Zealand Cavaliers tour of South Africa, the All Blacks won, and a number of new faces made their mark on the selectors. Despite this start, Fitzpatrick went into the 1987 Rugby Union World Cup as second choice to captain Andy Dalton. Dalton missed the early stages of the tournament due to injury, and although he recovered in time for the knockout stages, Fitzpatrick kept his place in the team, leaving scrum-half David Kirk to skipper the side to victory against France in the final at Eden Park in Auckland.

== Captain of the All Blacks ==
In 1992 Fitzpatrick was awarded the captaincy of the All Blacks, a position he held until his retirement from test rugby. A first test match win against the Springboks since their return from isolation, plus series victories over a World XV and Ireland were dampened by the loss of the Bledisloe Cup in Australia.

The biggest event of the rugby calendar in 1993 was the British & Irish Lions tour to New Zealand. The first test went narrowly to the All Blacks, with Grant Fox kicking a last minute 50-metre penalty to steal a win. This was avenged in the Second Test by the Lions with their highest-scoring Test win in New Zealand. In the third test, with Fitzpatrick faced the prospect of becoming only the second ever All Blacks captain to lead his team to a series defeat against the Lions. The side were 10–0 down at one point, but recovered to take the match convincingly and with it the series.

Unwanted history could not be avoided on the end of season tour of Britain however, as England picked up a win over New Zealand at Twickenham. 1994 was another up and down season for the All Blacks. South Africa were defeated 2–0 with one game drawn. However, France caused a major upset by winning their series in New Zealand 2–0, the first and until 2022, only European team to achieve this.

By the time of the 1995 World Cup New Zealand had assembled a more formidable side. Ian Jones, Jeff Wilson, Andrew Mehrtens, Zinzan Brooke and Jonah Lomu had proved themselves as world-class players. New Zealand were most pundit's pre-tournament favourites. The All Blacks had convincingly defeated all opponents, the most remarkable being a semi-final against England, in which Lomu scored four tries. They met the hosts, South Africa, in the final, who had stuttered through the early stages. South Africa won the tournament in extra time with a Joel Stransky drop goal.

After storming through the first Tri Nations Series unbeaten, the All Blacks embarked upon a further three-match series in South Africa. The 1996 tour of South Africa was the first series win by a New Zealand side in South Africa. The 1996 All Blacks were one of the great teams in the history of the game, and the series win cemented their captain's place among the true greats. Continued success with Auckland in the NPC and the Auckland Blues in the new Super 12 continued in the following seasons, but it was clear that Fitzpatrick's days in the game were numbered. He was carrying an injury in the autumn of 1997, yet such was his status that coach John Hart thought it would be good for the other players to include him in the party. He made his 92nd and final test appearance on 29 November 1997 as a substitute in the 42–7 victory against Wales at Wembley.

Fitzpatrick was appointed an Officer of the New Zealand Order of Merit, for services to rugby, in the 1997 New Year Honours.

== Honours ==
Auckland

- National Provincial Championship 1987, 1988, 1989, 1990, 1993, 1994, 1995, 1996
- Ranfurly Shield 1995, 1996

Blues

- Super Rugby 1996, 1997

New Zealand

- World Cup 1987
- Bledisloe Cup 1987, 1988, 1989, 1990, 1991, 1993, 1995, 1996, 1997
- Tri Nations 1996, 1997
- British & Irish Lions series victory 1993
- International record for most consecutive test matches (63 successive Tests between 1986 & 1996.)
- International team record for most consecutive tests without defeat (23 test matches between 1987 and 1990)

Sporting positions
Preceded by Gary Whetton	All Blacks Captain; 1992–1997	Succeeded by Justin Marshall (interim captain); Taine Randell (permanent appointment)
