= Margaret Beveridge Stevenson =

First New Zealander of the Baháʼí Faith (1865–1941)

- Born: 1865; Onehunga, New Zealand
- Died: 1941 (aged 75–76); Auckland, New Zealand

Margaret Beveridge Stevenson (30 November 1865 – 11 February 1941) was the first New Zealand member of the Baháʼí Faith.

== Biography ==
Born in the fencible settlement of Onehunga in New Zealand on 30 November 1865 to mother Margaret Turnbull and father, William Stevenson.

In 1913, at age 47, Stevenson became a member of the Baha'i faith, and New Zealand's first member. By 1924 she became president of the New Zealand Baha'i group and was widely noted as the "mother of the cause". Margaret was introduced to the Baha'i faith by her sister Amy who had heard ‘Abdu’l-bahá, who father founded the faith, speak in London.

She died on 11 February 1941 and is buried at Hillsborough Cemetery.
