= Samantha Scott =

New Zealand theatre and television director

Samantha Scott MNZM
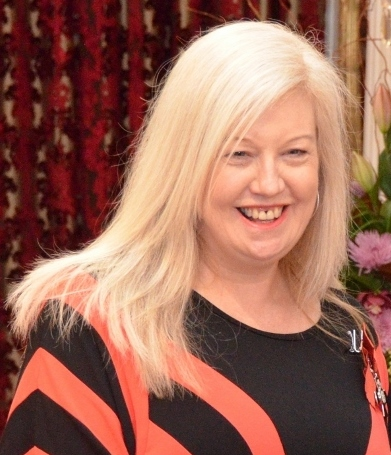
- Awards: NEXT Woman of the Year: Arts & Culture, Member of the New Zealand Order of Merit

Samantha Jane Scott MNZM is a New Zealand theatre and television director. She established the Maidment Youth Theatre (now Massive Theatre Company) in 1991. In 2013 Scott was appointed a Member of the New Zealand Order of Merit for services to theatre.

== Early life and education ==
Scott grew up in Auckland, and attended Westlake Girls High School. Her great-grandmother was feminist and activist Miriam Soljak. Her grandmother, Miriam's daughter, was trade unionist and anti-abortion campaigner Connie Purdue. Scott's parents were involved in theatre, and her mother in local politics too, and as a teenager Scott joined Auckland Youth Theatre, run by Mark Wright, Alison Wall, Christian Penny and Anna Marbrook. While at school Scott had an exchange visit to Reading, Pennsylvania. She also trained at Ecole Philippe Gaulier in London.

== Career ==
Scott worked as director at Northland Youth Theatre before co-founding Maidment Youth Theatre in 1991. She was the artistic director at Maidment until 1997, when she founded Aotearoa Young People's Theatre. The Maidment Youth Theatre was originally for actors under 25, but transformed in Massive Theatre Company when actors started asking how to stay involved when they passed that age. Scott took the cast of Massive's production of The Sons of Charlie Paora to London and Paris. They were the first New Zealand company on stage at London's Royal Court Theatre. Massive Theatre Company celebrated its thirtieth anniversary in 2021. Scott set up a mentorship programme called The Directors’ Lab in 2015.

Scott has directed for television and film, and was director of the soap opera Shortland Street for ten years, beginning in the late 1990s. She also directed an award-winning short film, His Father’s Shoes, released in 2004.

== Honours and awards ==
Scott won the NEXT Woman of the Year: Arts & Culture award in 2019.

In the 2013 Queen's Birthday Honours she was appointed a Member of the New Zealand Order of Merit for services to theatre.

== Personal life ==
Scott's partner is actor and drama teacher Robert Pollock.
