= Liriomyza urticae =

- Leaf mines of Liriomyza urticae in Urtica ferox leaf

Scientific classification
- Kingdom: Animalia
- Phylum: Arthropoda
- Clade: Pancrustacea
- Class: Insecta
- Order: Diptera
- Family: Agromyzidae
- Genus: Liriomyza
- Species: L. urticae

Binomial name
- Liriomyza urticae (Watt, 1924)

Species of fly

Liriomyza urticae is a species of leaf-miner fly endemic to New Zealand.
