= Daphne de Jong =

Dutch aerospace engineer (born 1990)

- Born: 1990 (age 35–36); The Netherlands
- Education: Cranfield University (MSc), International Space University (MSc)
- Awards: Forbes 30 under 30

Daphne de Jong is an aerospace engineer and a trained commercial pilot. In 2018, she was listed as Forbes 30 under 30 in consumer technology. She worked on the first Amazon Prime Air customer delivery in the United Kingdom and has also worked at Waymo, Rivian, SpaceX and NASA Ames.

== Education ==
De Jong graduated from Cranfield University with a MSc in aerospace engineering and from International Space University with a MSc in space technologies.

== Career ==
Daphne de Jong worked for Waymo and Rivian on advanced autonomous vehicles. Previously, she also worked for SpaceX. At Amazon Prime Air she contributed to deliver Amazon's packages to their customers by autonomous drones. She also spent time at NASA Ames, focused on optimizing flight networks.

== Personal life ==
De Jong has described her goal as the development of technologies that will transform people's lives, a topic she discussed in her TEDx talk and multiple interviews.

In 2019, she climbed Mount Everest.
