= Auckland Sun =

Two newspapers published in Auckland, New Zealand, have been called The Sun or The Auckland Sun.

The first Sun was started on 23 March 1927 by Edward Chalmers Huie, who already ran the Christchurch Sun. It operated in competition with the Auckland Star and The New Zealand Herald. The Star retaliated by purchasing the Lyttelton Times and the Christchurch Star to compete with the Sun on its home turf. The Auckland Sun was bought out and closed down in 1930 by a major shareholder in the Auckland Star and the owners of The New Zealand Herald. The last issue was on 19 September 1930.

The evening paper Auckland Star decided in 1987 to challenge the morning New Zealand Herald by publishing a tabloid format morning paper. The Auckland Sun launched on 10 August 1987. The paper was affected by the 1987 stock market crash and closed a year later. The last issue was on 8 July 1988.
