= Brian Fitzpatrick (rugby union) =

NZ international rugby union player

- Born: Brian Bernard James Fitzpatrick; 5 March 1931 Ōpōtiki, New Zealand
- Died: 2 October 2006 (aged 75) Auckland, New Zealand
- Height: 1.78 m (5 ft 10 in)
- Weight: 85 kg (187 lb)
- School: Gisborne Boys' High School
- University: Victoria University College; Auckland University College
- Notable relative: Sean Fitzpatrick (son)

Rugby union career
- Position(s): Second five-eighth, first five-eighth
Provincial / State sides
Years	Team	Apps	(Points)
1949–1951	Poverty Bay	16	
1952–1953	Wellington	11	
1954–1956	Auckland	7	
International career
Years	Team	Apps	(Points)
1951–1954	New Zealand	3	(0)
1952–1956	New Zealand Universities		

Brian Bernard James Fitzpatrick (5 March 1931 – 2 October 2006) was a New Zealand rugby union player. Primarily a second five-eighth, Fitzpatrick represented Poverty Bay, Wellington, and Auckland at a provincial level, and was a member of the New Zealand national side, the All Blacks, from 1951 to 1954. He played 22 matches for the All Blacks including three internationals.
