= Emily Patricia Gibson =

New Zealand proof-reader, feminist, socialist and internationalist

Emily Gibson
- Born: Emily Ray; 24 June 1864; Dublin, Ireland
- Died: 24 April 1947 (aged 82); Auckland, New Zealand
- Occupation(s): suffragist, women's rights activist proof-reader
- Spouse: William Edward Gibson (d.1936)
- Children: 3

Emily Patricia Gibson (24 June 1864 – 24 April 1947) was a New Zealand feminist, socialist, internationalist and proofreader.

== Early life ==
Gibson was born in Dublin, County Dublin, Ireland. Her first move was to Blackrock, where she originally trained as a compositor and proofreader. After this training, she moved to London and spent 12 years working as a compositor. While in London, Gibson was actively involved in the women's suffrage movement.

In 1891, Gibson emigrated to New Zealand with her sister and two nieces, arriving in Wellington but moving up to Auckland soon after her arrival, where she spent the rest of her life. She worked as a proofreader at the Auckland Star for some time, before her three children were born. She also wrote stories and poems, and in 1903, she won the second prize in the New Zealand Literary and Historical Association Competition for her short story entitled An Angel Unawares.

== Political engagement ==
=== Feminism ===
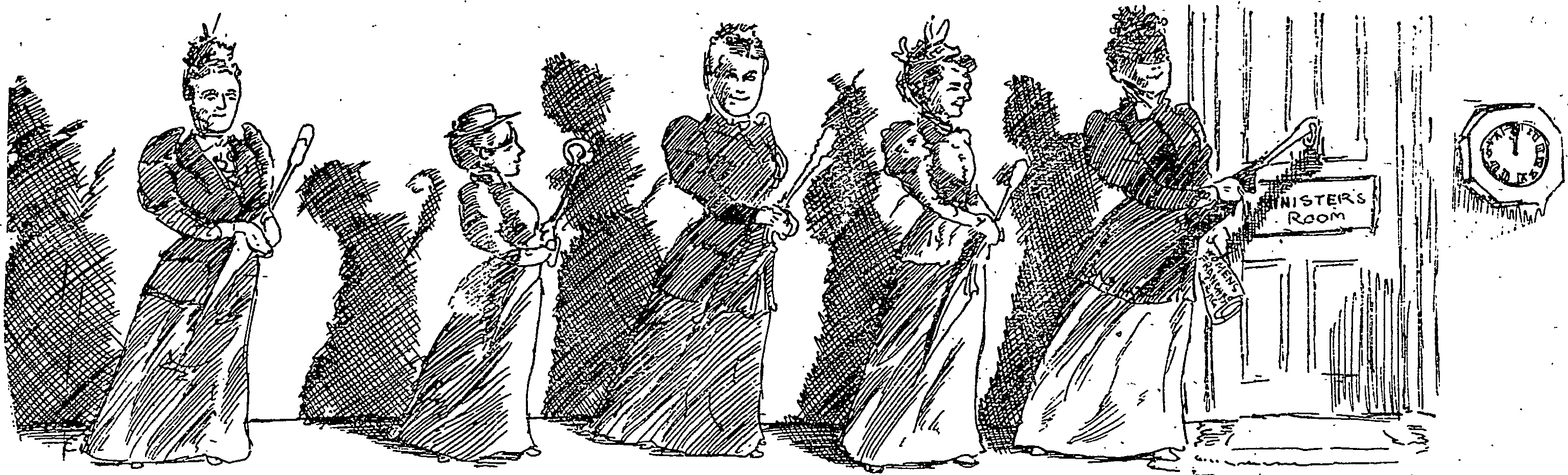
An illustration of the Auckland Women's Franchise League in 1893 from the New Zealand newspaper 'The Observer'

Gibson was among the women who voted for the first time at the Army Hall in the centre of Auckland in November 1893. Soon after this event, she and a group of women decided to form the Auckland Women's Liberal League, and despite retiring two years after its inception, she was acknowledged for her significant services to this group.

Gibson frequently spoke out about the current issues that women were facing, particularly those related to the women's suffrage movement. In 1906, she wrote to the editor of the New Zealand Herald, criticising the harsh stance that men had regarding women's suffrage. In particular, she disapproved of those who did not take women's suffrage seriously and were putting unrealistic expectations on the movement. She highlighted that it was unfair and illogical to expect that women should be able to "reform everything and everybody" and that it was too soon to expect women to be able to influence better parliamentary representatives and better laws.

Furthermore, Gibson helped to educate the public on the positives that the women's suffrage movement had brought to society. This included highlighting that the age of consent had been raised from 13 years old to 16 years old after women achieved the vote and also that the law of divorce had been altered to give women equal rights to men in divorce cases – the result of women petitioning for these issues to change.

Concurrently, she would regularly advocate for women to take better advantage of their political 'privileges,' urging for more women to take positions on councils in New Zealand. In an article in the Auckland Star, she argued that Auckland would greatly benefit from more women standing for election because they would provide practical, valuable advice on the running of schools, businesses, charitable aid and general public services.

Gibson also raised awareness about the rights of domestic servants, questioning why male-dominated occupations were limited to eight-hour legal working days, yet domestic servants still did not have legally limited hours. She was equally concerned about the quality of life of mothers and strongly opposed societal expectations for women to overwork themselves within their homes. Her article Don'ts for Wives, published on the first page of the New Zealand Herald, exemplified this and received wide support from other women. She had also proposed that a scheme be created that would better support mothers emotionally and financially so that they could gain more time for themselves and their children.

Between 1937 and 1939, the monthly Woman To-day magazine operated, which covered topics on birth control, abortion, childcare, gender-based income inequality and social issues. During its existence, Gibson was one of the members of the magazine's Advisory Board.

==== Auckland Women's Political League (AWPL) ====
In 1907, Gibson and her sister revived the Auckland Women's Political League (AWPL), which had gone into recess two years prior. Emily served as secretary from 1907–1913 and then again from 1914–1917.

1907 was a year that Gibson made significant efforts to garner more attention for women's rights. She defended working women during an era where people argued that if women worked, they would not make good wives. She asserted that women who worked deserved to spend their own money without judgment, just as their male counterparts could.

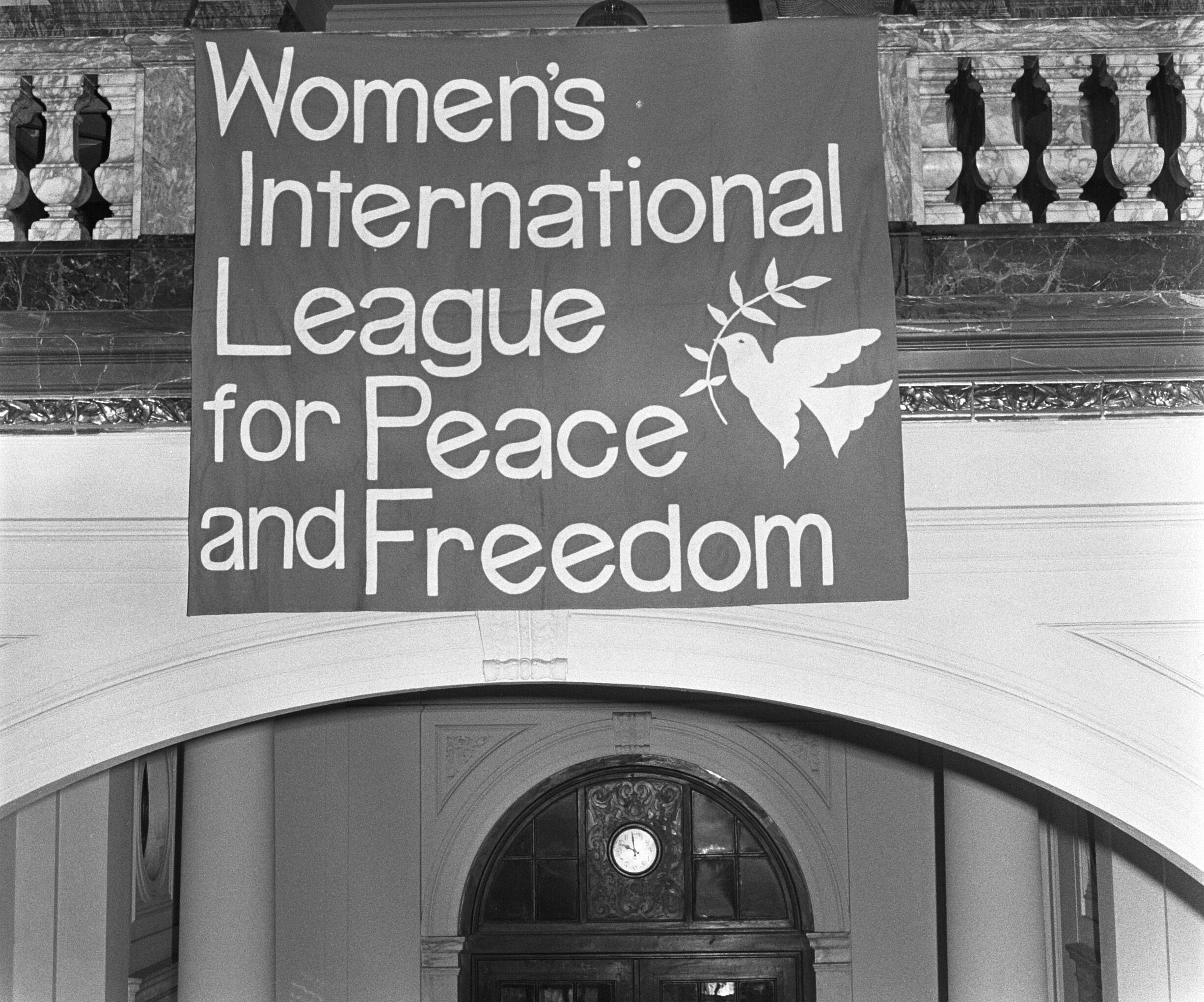
The Women's International League for Peace and Freedom logo

==== Women's International League for Peace and Freedom (WILPF) ====
Gibson was one of the founding members of the Women's International League for Peace and Freedom (WILPF) in Auckland, which was established in 1916. Within New Zealand, Auckland was the only city to have a WILPF from the 1920s until 1964. In 1925 it became the Auckland women's branch of the Labour Party, and Gibson was responsible for keeping contact with the international body in Geneva. In 1927, it was reported that Gibson was the oldest member of the women's council of the Labour Party. Throughout the 1930s until the late 1940s, membership was small, and there was little activity. Gibson is considered to have single-handedly kept the WILPF alive and running during this period.

== Social justice and peace ==
=== Socialism and internationalism ===
Gibson considered herself a socialist, and she advocated for greater accessibility for educational and working rights. She called for the price of schoolbooks to be lowered, arguing that if education is free, then the resources required to learn should be free, too. She also advocated for better treatment of factory workers, declaring that both men and women should be paid a living wage, which she also argued would attract more adult workers to the factories so that unskilled child labour could be eradicated.

Gibson's writing occasionally featured in the Woman To-day magazine. She determined where the Child Welfare Act needed revision, listing areas that should be fixed so as to correct the discrimination against young girls in particular. Further, she encouraged readers to be active in their communities to show resistance to the second world war breaking out. She persuaded readers to join their nearest Peace Society and educate others on the consequences of war. In 1937, when Japan invaded China, she wrote an article suggesting all women boycott everything made in Japan "in the name of humanity". Then, in 1938, she was featured in the 'Peace Messages from Prominent Women' section of Woman To-day, discussing the ideals of peace within New Zealand.

Furthermore, Gibson is considered an internationalist due to her strong agreement with the beliefs of the League of Nations and her significant support of groups such as the Auckland WILPF and AWPL. She regularly engaged in matters regarding international politics. In 1931, the Disarmament Conference at Geneva was held, and the WILPF, led by Gibson, organised a meeting to express their support, favouring the cause. Held in the Auckland Town Hall, Gibson was in charge of organising this meeting, speaking on the efforts that the Auckland WILPF had made towards peace for the past 16 years. As part of their efforts, between 1930 and 1931, Gibson led the movement to collect signatures for the petition for world disarmament, and as a result, the WILPF collected nearly 42,000 signatures.

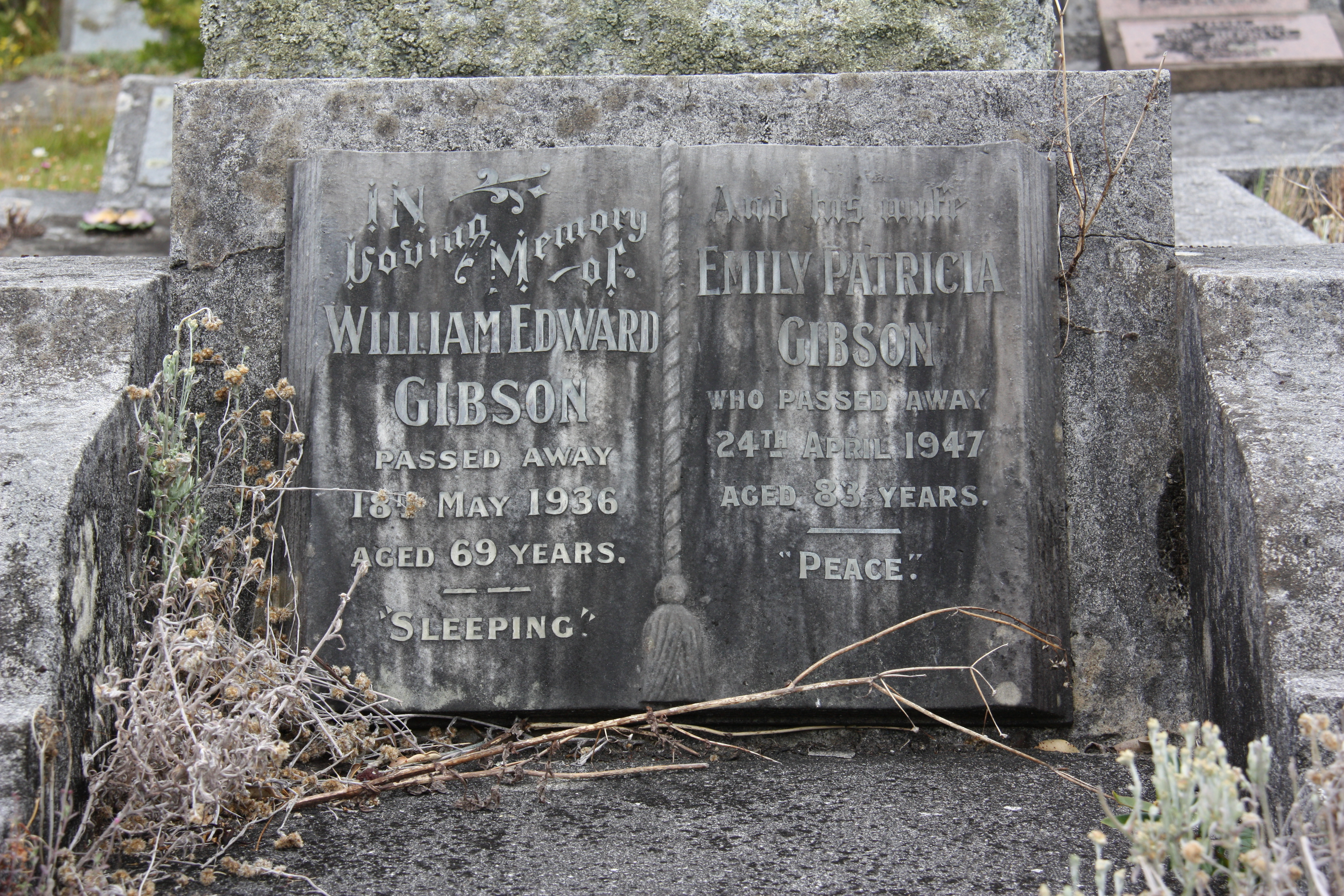
The headstone of Emily Gibson

== Later life ==
In 1940, on the forty-seventh anniversary of the granting of the franchise to women, Gibson and three of the women who had been the first to record their vote in Auckland were celebrated for this achievement.

Gibson died in Auckland on 24 April 1947.
