= New Zealand Clerical Workers Union =

New Zealand Clerical Workers' Union began in 1936 as Wellington Clerical Workers' Union. It negotiated the first general clerical workers award in 1936. Wellington amalgamated with other regional unions and finally formed New Zealand Clerical Workers Union.

The union was obliged to cease operating by the passing of the Employment Contracts Act 1991.
