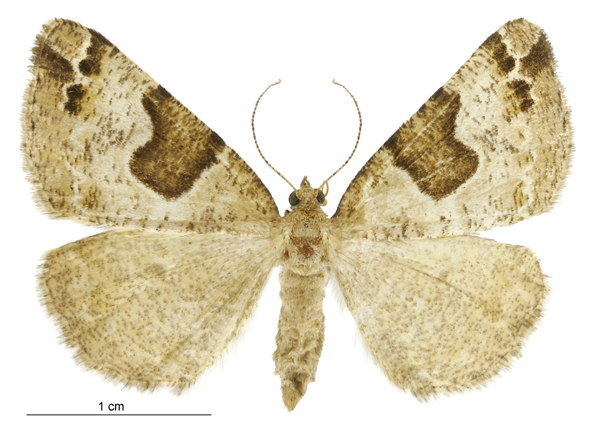
- Female
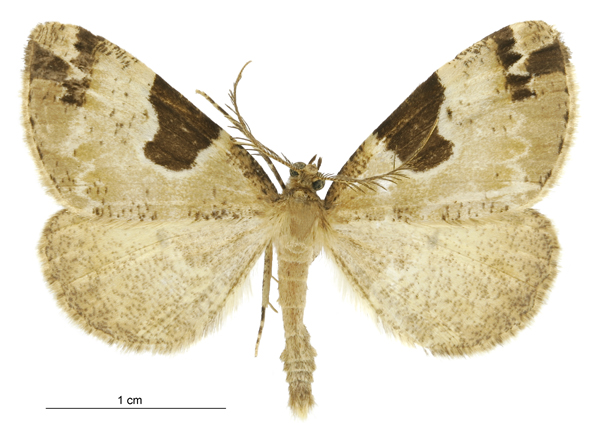
- Male

Scientific classification
- Kingdom: Animalia
- Phylum: Arthropoda
- Class: Insecta
- Order: Lepidoptera
- Family: Geometridae
- Genus: Pseudocoremia
- Species: P. flava

Binomial name
- Pseudocoremia flava Warren, 1896

Synonyms
- Selidosema flaνa (Warren, 1896)

= Pseudocoremia flava =

Species of moth endemic to New Zealand

Pseudocoremia flava is a species of moth in the family Geometridae. It is endemic to New Zealand.
