= Papers Past =

Online New Zealand archive

- Available in: English; Māori
- Founded: 2001
- Country of origin: New Zealand
- Creator: National Library of New Zealand
- Website: paperspast.natlib.govt.nz

Papers Past is a website run by the National Library of New Zealand that provides free access to digitised newspapers, magazines, journals, letters, diaries, and parliamentary papers from the 19th and 20th centuries. It has over 9.4 million pages as of 2026.

== History ==
Papers Past was launched in August 2001 with 20 publications and about 300,000 pages. Users initially had to install a Java applet to view the contents, and were unable to search through the collection by text. In 2007 a new Papers Past website was launched, which used the digital library platform Greenstone, developed by the University of Waikato. The new website used optical character recognition to scan the contents of the pages to allow users to search through them. Not all titles became searchable after this update—it took until 2009 for this to happen. The Papers Past website was redesigned in 2016. In 2024 a correctable text feature was added, allowing users to correct errors in the automatically scanned text.

In 2014 Papers Past included an estimated 3.3 million digitised pages. As of 2026, Papers Past has 9,403,907 pages, including over 8.3 million newspaper pages, 560,000 pages of magazines and journals, 300,000 parliamentary paper pages, 100,000 book pages and 23,000 pages of diaries.

== Usage ==
Papers Past is run by the National Library of New Zealand and provides free access to digitised newspapers, magazines, journals, letters, diaries, and parliamentary papers from the 19th and 20th centuries. In 2020 Papers Past had approximately 30 million page views. As of 2021 most users of Papers Past are genealogists, but other people who use the website include lawyers and students.

== Timeline of digitisation ==
In about 2015, over 120,000 pages, comprising 18 different Māori periodicals, were added to Papers Past.

In 2015 it was announced that several newspapers from Central Otago and Queenstown would be added to Papers Past, including the Alexandra Herald, Cromwell Argus, Dunstan Times and Lake County Mail.

In 2019, issues of the Forest & Bird magazine from the 1920s to 1940s were added to Papers Past.

In 2021, an agreement was reached to digitise and add editions of The Press up to 1995 to Papers Past. Papers Past already included editions from 1861 to 1945, and the project represented the first major expansion of post-1950 newspaper content on the site. Editions from 1946 to 1961 were added in September 2021, from 1962 to 1971 in March 2022, from 1972 to 1979 in July 2022, from 1980 to 1989 in May 2023, and finally from 1990 to 1995 in November 2025.

In September 2024 it was announced that issues of the New Zealand Listener magazine from 1939 to 2018 would be added to Papers Past and so would the New Zealand Woman's Weekly.

In May 2025 Marlborough Express newspapers from 1929 to 1952 were added to Papers Past. Bound collections of the newspapers were delivered to Wellington by car and ferry for digitisation.
