= Auckland Star =

New Zealand newspaper (1870–1991)

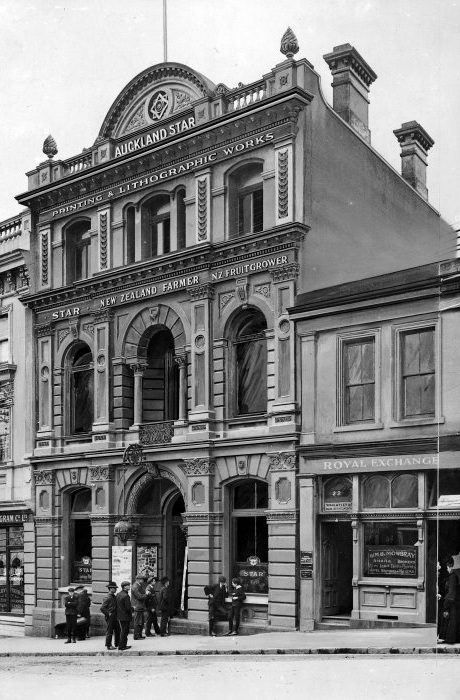
- The original newspaper building on Shortland Street, designed by W.H. Skinner, as seen in 1910.
- Type: Daily Newspaper
- Format: Broadsheet
- Founded: 1870
- Ceased publication: 1991
- Headquarters: Auckland, New Zealand

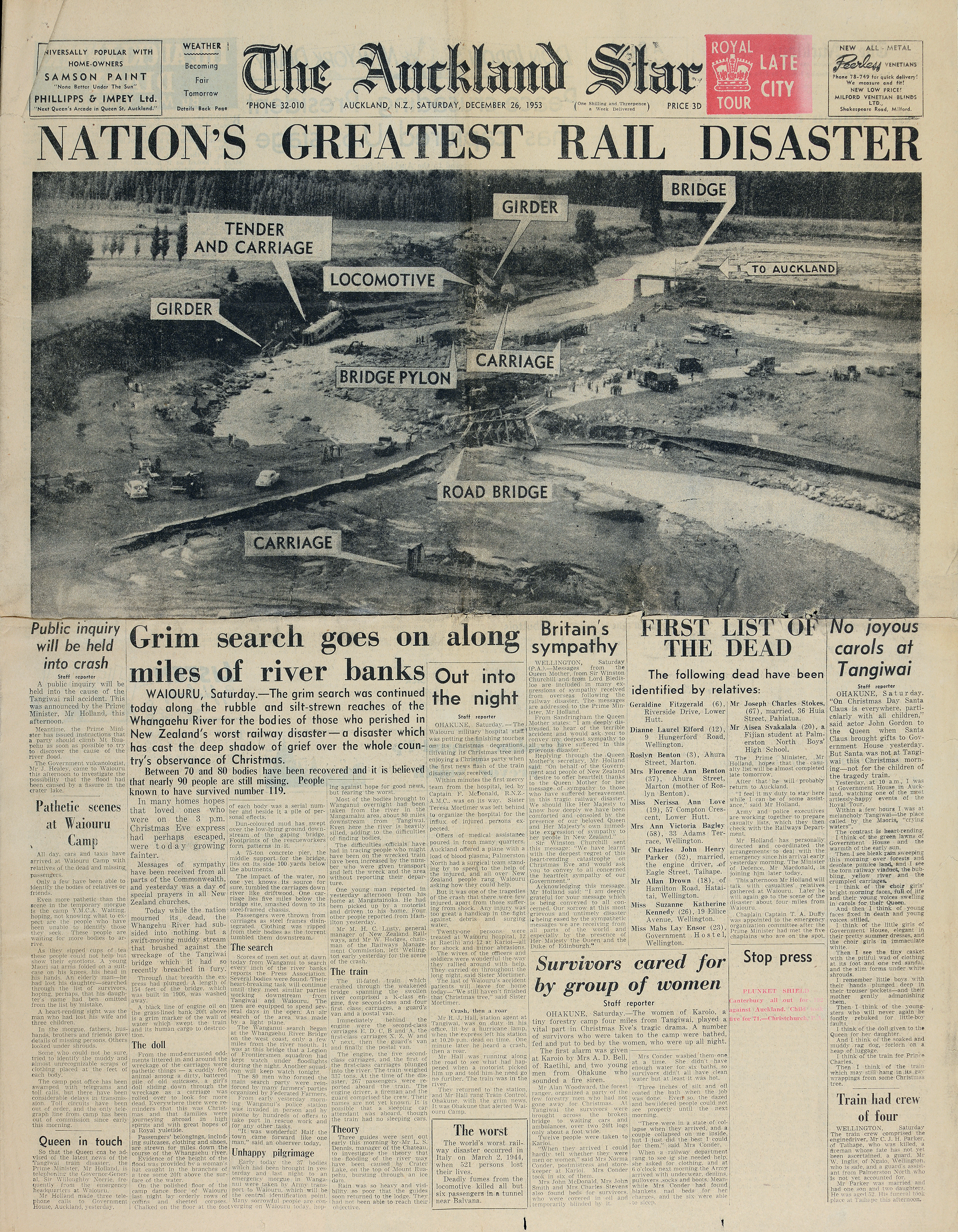
Front page of 26 December 1953 reporting the Tangiwai great railway disaster

The Auckland Star was an evening daily newspaper published in Auckland, New Zealand, from 24 March 1870 to 16 August 1991. Survived by its Sunday edition, the Sunday Star, part of its name endures in The Sunday Star-Times, created in the 1994 merger of the Dominion Sunday Times and the Sunday Star.

Originally published as the Evening Star from 24 March 1870 to 7 March 1879, the paper continued as the Auckland Evening Star between 8 March 1879 and 12 April 1887, and from then on as the Auckland Star.

One of the paper's notable investigative journalists was Pat Booth, who was responsible for notable coverage of the Crewe murders and the eventual exoneration of Arthur Allan Thomas. Booth and the paper extensively reported on the Mr Asia case.

In 1987, the owners of the Star launched a morning newspaper to more directly compete with The New Zealand Herald. The Auckland Sun was affected by the 1987 stock market crash and folded a year later.

Peter Bromhead was the editorial cartoonist from 1973 to 1989, and Guy Body also created editorial cartoons.

When the newspaper ran editorials in 1991 opposing the work of a gay youth group (Auckland Lesbian and Gay Youth), the paper in turn became subject to strong protests from gay activists. After failing to convince the paper's editor, Frank Haden, to retract his editorials, the activists started a campaign that included discouraging advertisers from booking ads in the paper – a strategy which the activists credit with causing the paper to fold later in the year.
