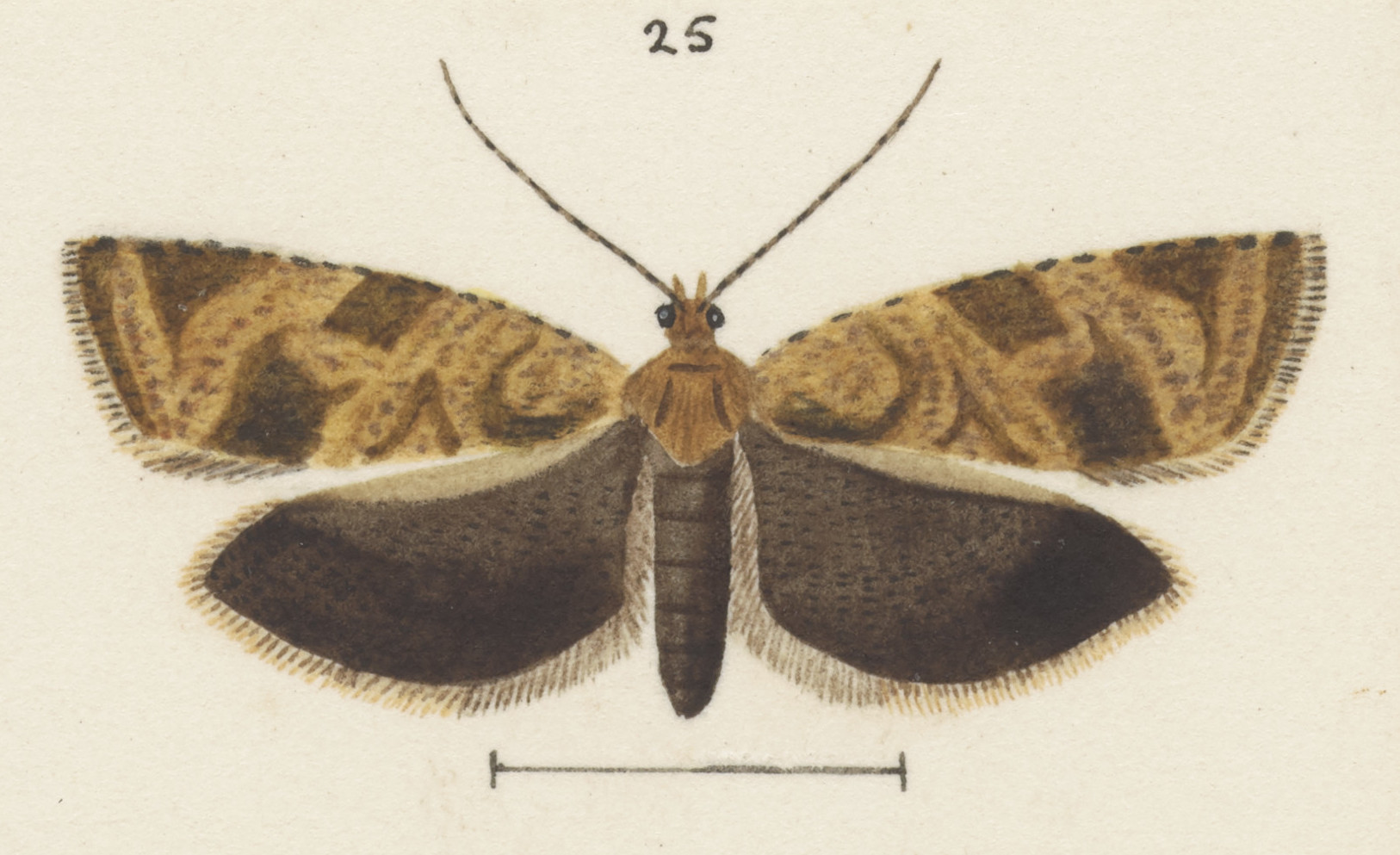
- Female
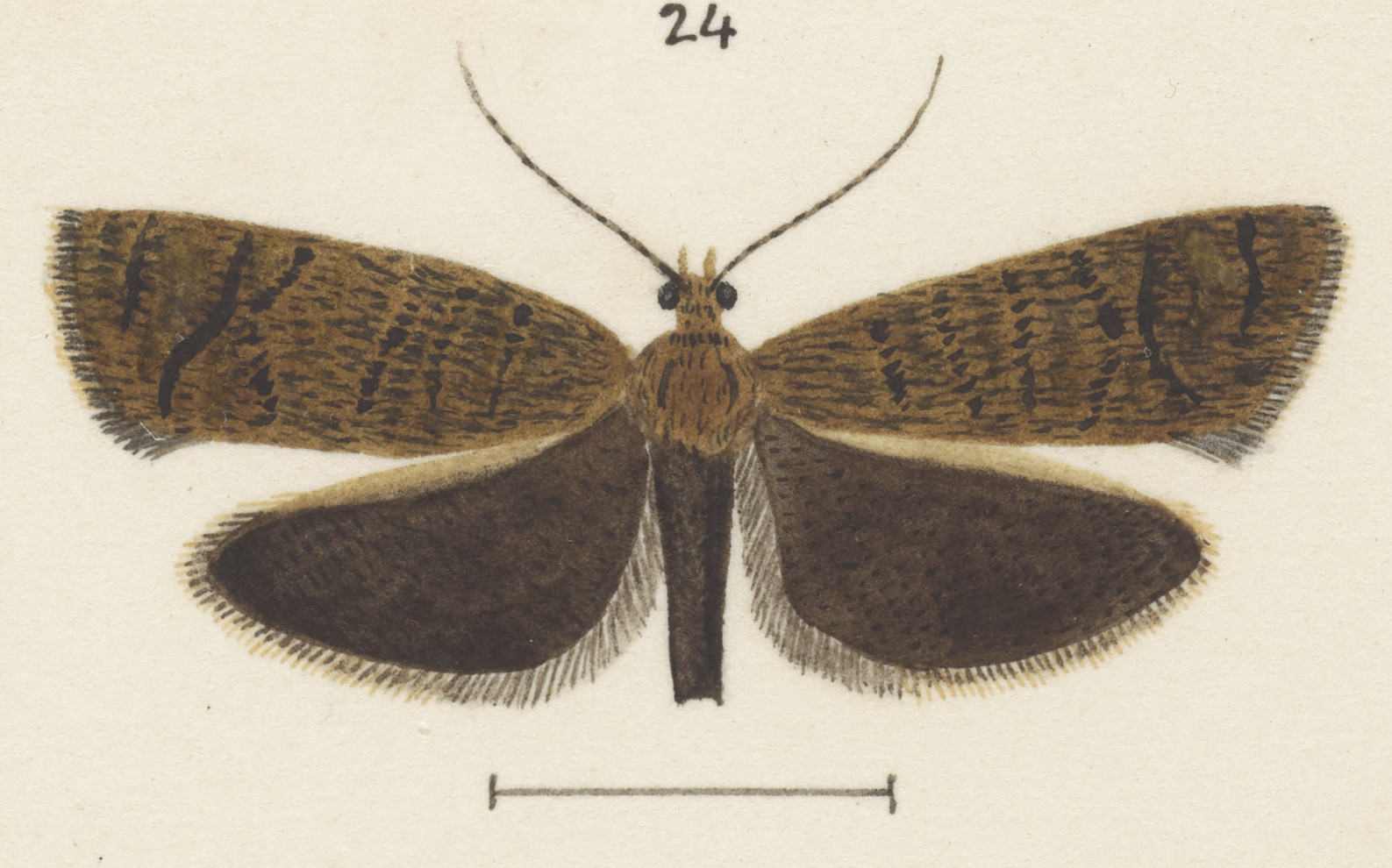
- Male

Scientific classification
- Kingdom: Animalia
- Phylum: Arthropoda
- Clade: Pancrustacea
- Class: Insecta
- Order: Lepidoptera
- Family: Tortricidae
- Genus: Epichorista
- Species: E. crypsidora

Binomial name
- Epichorista crypsidora (Meyrick, 1909)

Synonyms
- Dipterina crypsidora Meyrick, 1909; Epichorista carcharodes Meyrick, 1914

= Epichorista crypsidora =

Species of moth endemic to New Zealand

Epichorista crypsidora is a species of moth of the family Tortricidae. This species was first described by Edward Meyrick in 1909. It is endemic to New Zealand and has been observed in both the North and South Islands. This species inhabits open glades in native forest and scrub. Adults are on the wing from November until January. They are day flying and active in bright sunshine.

== Taxonomy ==
This species was first described by Edward Meyrick in 1909 using a specimen collected at Western Plains, Invercargill by Alfred Philpott and named Dipterina crypsidora. In 1914 Meyrick, thinking he was describing a new species, named this moth Epichorista carcharodes. In 1923 Meyrick placed Dipterina crypsiodra in the genus Epichorista. George Hudson discussed and illustrated this species under the name Epichorista crysidora in his 1928 book The butterflies and moths of New Zealand. Hudson also synonymised Epichorista carcharodes. Also in 1928 Alfred Philpott discussed the male genitalia of this species. As at 2025, this species is regarded as being taxonomically unresolved as it likely belongs to another genus. It is therefore also known as Epichorista (s.l.) crypsidora. The male holotype specimen is held at the Natural History Museum, London.

== Description ==
Meyrick described the male of this species as follows:

♂ . 12 mm. Head, palpi, and thorax brown mixed with dark fuscous; palpi under 2, whitish-ochreous towards base; antennal ciliations 2. Abdomen dark fuscous. Forewings elongate-oblong, costa anteriorly moderately arched, apex obtuse, termen slightly rounded, somewhat oblique; dark purplish-fuscous, irregularly strigulated with blackish-fuscous; a narrow blackish-fuscous fascia from middle of costa to 3/4 of dorsum, slightly curved, somewhat expanded towards costa; the dark strigulation tends to form two or three spots towards apex : cilia dark fuscous, towards tips paler and somewhat mixed with orange-ochreous. Hindwings dark fuscous, more blackish posteriorly; cilia grey mixed with bronzy, with blackish-grey basal shade, tips more whitish. Forewings beneath with, a short longitudinal coppery - orange streak beneath upper margin of cell before middle of wing.

== Distribution ==
This species is endemic to New Zealand. It has been observed in both the North and South Islands.

== Habitat and hosts ==
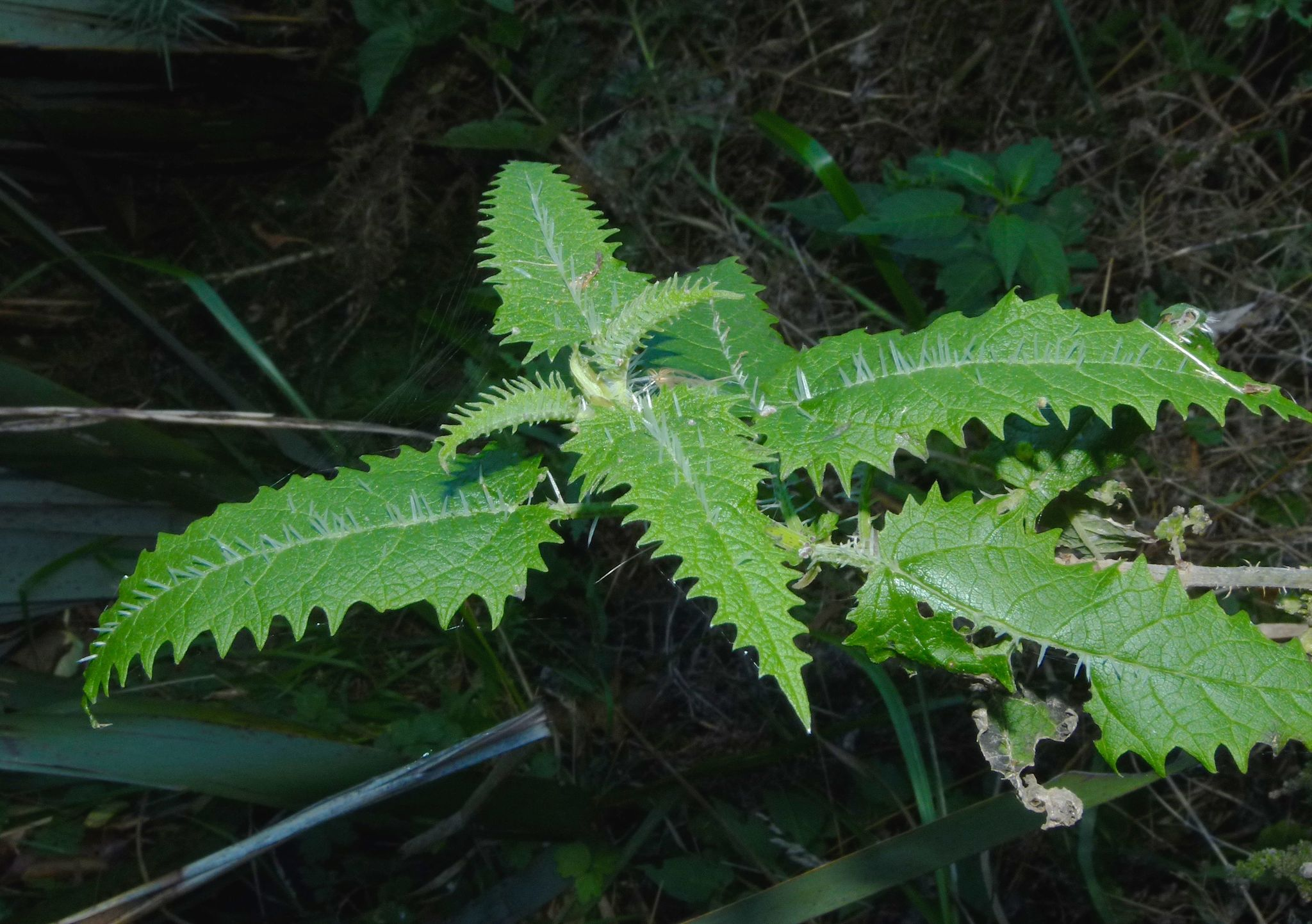
Larval host plant, Urtica ferox.

E. crypsidora inhabit open glades in native forest or scrub. The larval host plants of this species are species in the genus Urtica including Urtica ferox, Urtica aspera, Urtica linearifolia and Urtica sykesii.

== Behaviour ==
Adults are on the wing from November until January. They are day flying and are active in bright sunshine.
