= Urtica lalibertadensis =

Scientific classification
- Kingdom: Plantae
- Clade: Tracheophytes
- Clade: Angiosperms
- Clade: Eudicots
- Clade: Rosids
- Order: Rosales
- Family: Urticaceae
- Genus: Urtica
- Species: U. lalibertadensis

Binomial name
- Urtica lalibertadensis Weigend, 2005

Species of plant

Urtica lalibertadensis is a species of the genus Urtica. It differs from U. leptostachya in its subscandent habit and the deflexed stinging hairs on the glabrous stem, and by the presence of numerous stinging hairs on the perigon of the female flowers (and fruits) and individual stinging hairs on the perigon of the male flower. It is a very abundant species in Peru.

== Description ==
It is a lianescent subshrub or erect perennial herb around 0.615 metres (2.02 ft) tall. Its rhizome is around 35 millimetres (1.4 in) thick; its stems are erect, with numerous deflexed stinging hairs, approximately 1.52 millimetres (0.060 in) long. Its leaves are opposite, interpetiolar stipules united in pairs but deeply incised, about 610 millimetres (24 in) long and wide, without conspicuous cystoliths and with scattered, white simple trichomes along the margins. Petioles are 2.5 centimetres (0.98 in) long, abaxial surface with scattered pubescence on the veins and with scattered stinging hairs. Its inflorescences are androgynous, the lowest ones often pure male, upper one often pure female.

== Distribution ==
La Libertad and Ancash. Its distribution area includes the region where U. urentivelutina is found.
