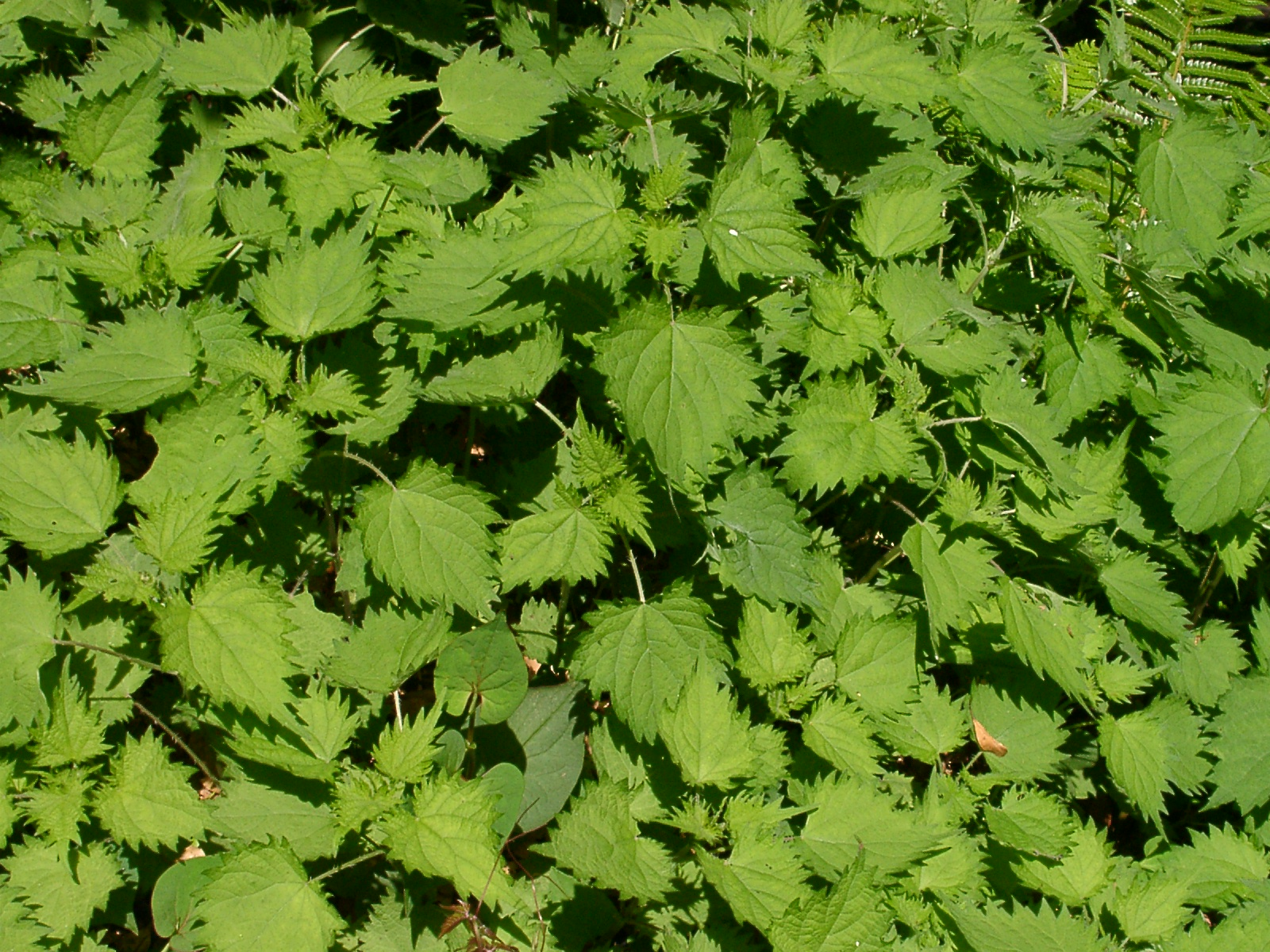

Scientific classification
- Kingdom: Plantae
- Clade: Embryophytes
- Clade: Tracheophytes
- Clade: Spermatophytes
- Clade: Angiosperms
- Clade: Eudicots
- Clade: Rosids
- Order: Rosales
- Family: Urticaceae
- Genus: Urtica
- Species: U. thunbergiana

Binomial name
- Urtica thunbergiana Siebold. & Zucc.

= Urtica thunbergiana =

Species of flowering plant

Urtica thunbergiana, also known as the Japanese nettle or hairy nettle, is a species of perennial herbs in the family Urticaceae. It is found in Japan, China and Taiwan. The habitat of the species is moist forests in the mountains. It is in flower from July to September, and its seeds ripen from August to October. The larvae of Vanessa indica, a species of butterfly, are known to feed on U. thunbergiana.

Chinese common names for U. thunbergiana translate to "biting cat", "biting nettle", and "stinging herbs" due to the stinging hairs on the plant that can cause skin pain, redness, burning or itching. Usually, the stinging sensation lasts for about 2 to 4 hours, and some people even feel the pain for 1 to 2 days, depending on the individual's constitution.

As with other species in the genus, U. thunbergiana can also be used as a food ingredient, because boiling water can destroy its toxicity. In Taiwan, in addition to flavored soup, it is also made into flavored bread, Chinese shortbread or crispy fried leaves.

From 2016 to 2017, Shei-Pa National Park's headquarters commissioned a survey of animals along the Mount Dabajian hiking trail. In this investigation, a video of a Taiwan serow feeding on U. thunbergiana was recorded.

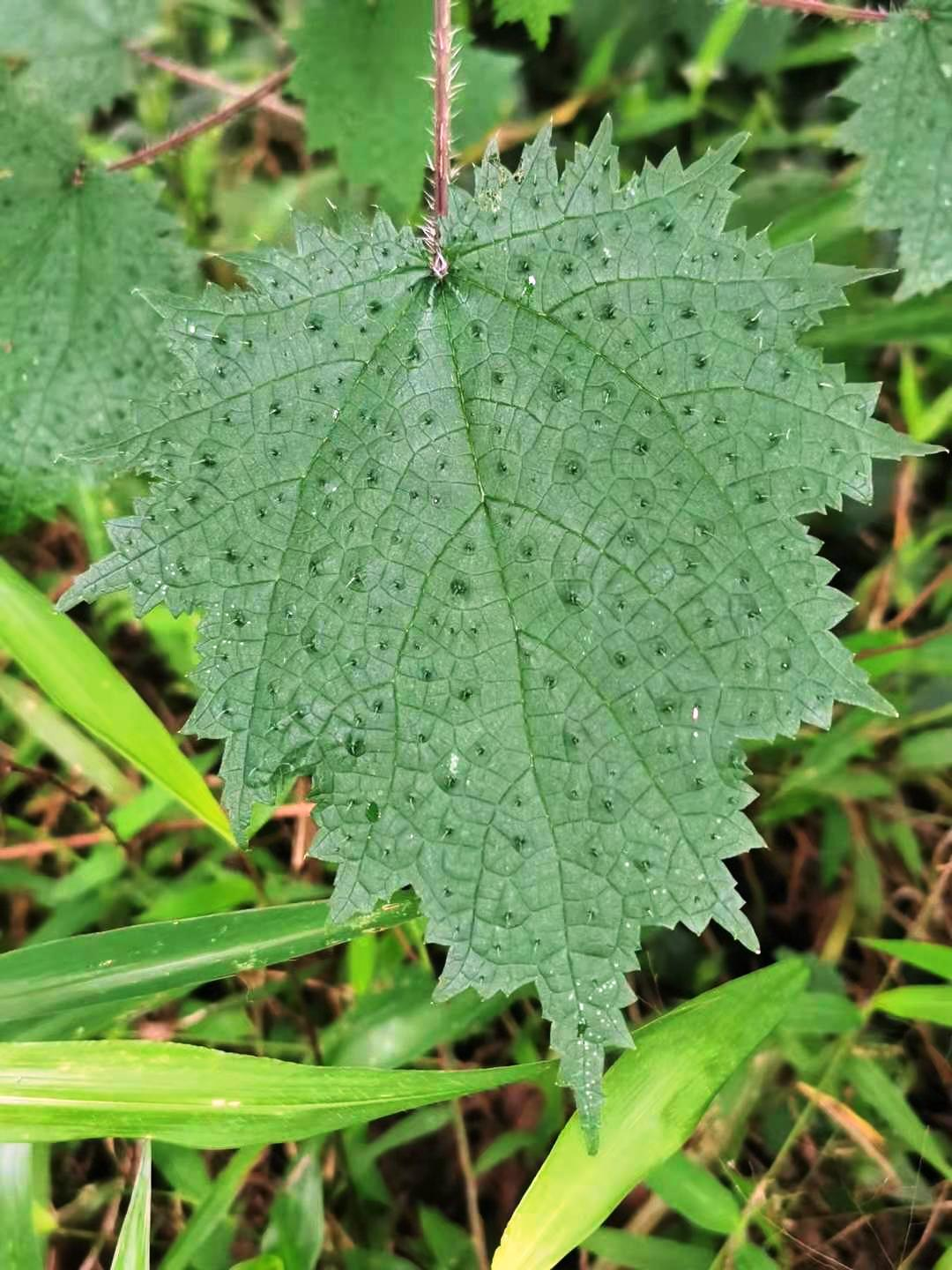
The dotted bumps on the leaves could be cystolith?
