= Urtica × oblongata =

Scientific classification
- Kingdom: Plantae
- Clade: Tracheophytes
- Clade: Angiosperms
- Clade: Eudicots
- Clade: Rosids
- Order: Rosales
- Family: Urticaceae
- Genus: Urtica
- Species: U. × oblongata

Binomial name
- Urtica × oblongata W.D.J.Koch ex Maly

Synonyms
- Urtica urens subsp. oblongata (W.D.J.Koch ex Maly ) Nyman

Hybrid species of plant

Urtica × oblongata is a hybrid species of the genus Urtica in the family Urticaceae (also known as the nettle family). It is thought to be a hybrid between U. dioica and U. urens.

== Description ==
Urtica × oblongata is an annual growing to about 3–4 ft (90–120 cm) tall. Its leaves are oblong, pointed and coarsely serrated, with a wedge-shaped base. The flowers appear in August and are arranged in long-stalked axillary racemes. It has thin roots and lacks runners.

== Taxonomy ==
As of August 2025, Plants of the World Online dated the first formal description of the hybrid to 1868 in a work authored by Joseph Karl Maly with the name attributed to Wilhelm Daniel Joseph Koch. Other sources suggest that it was first published in 1848, in additions to Maly's 1838 Flora Styriaca (Nachträge zu seiner im Jahre 1838 erschienenen Flora Styriaca von Dr. J. K. Maly).

Koch obtained his information about the plant from the collector Johan Zechenter, who found it in August 1833 near Weichselstatten, now in Slovenia, but then in Styria (Steiermark). It was near to plants of U. dioica and U. urens, and was possibly a hybrid between them. In 1868, it was noted that no plant had been found since 1833, nor could a herbarium specimen be located.

== Distribution ==
As of August 2025, Plants of the World Online gave the distribution as Austria and the former Czechoslovakia. The original plant was found in what is now Slovenia.
