= Dipterina =

Scientific classification
- Kingdom: Animalia
- Phylum: Arthropoda
- Class: Insecta
- Order: Lepidoptera
- Family: Tortricidae
- Tribe: Schoenotenini
- Genus: Dipterina; Meyrick, 1881

Genus of tortrix moths

Dipterina is a genus of moths belonging to the subfamily Tortricinae of the family Tortricidae.

== Species ==
- Dipterina imbriferana Meyrick, 1881

== Species formerly placed within the genus ==
- Epichorista crypsidora (Meyrick, 1909)

== See also ==
- List of Tortricidae genera
