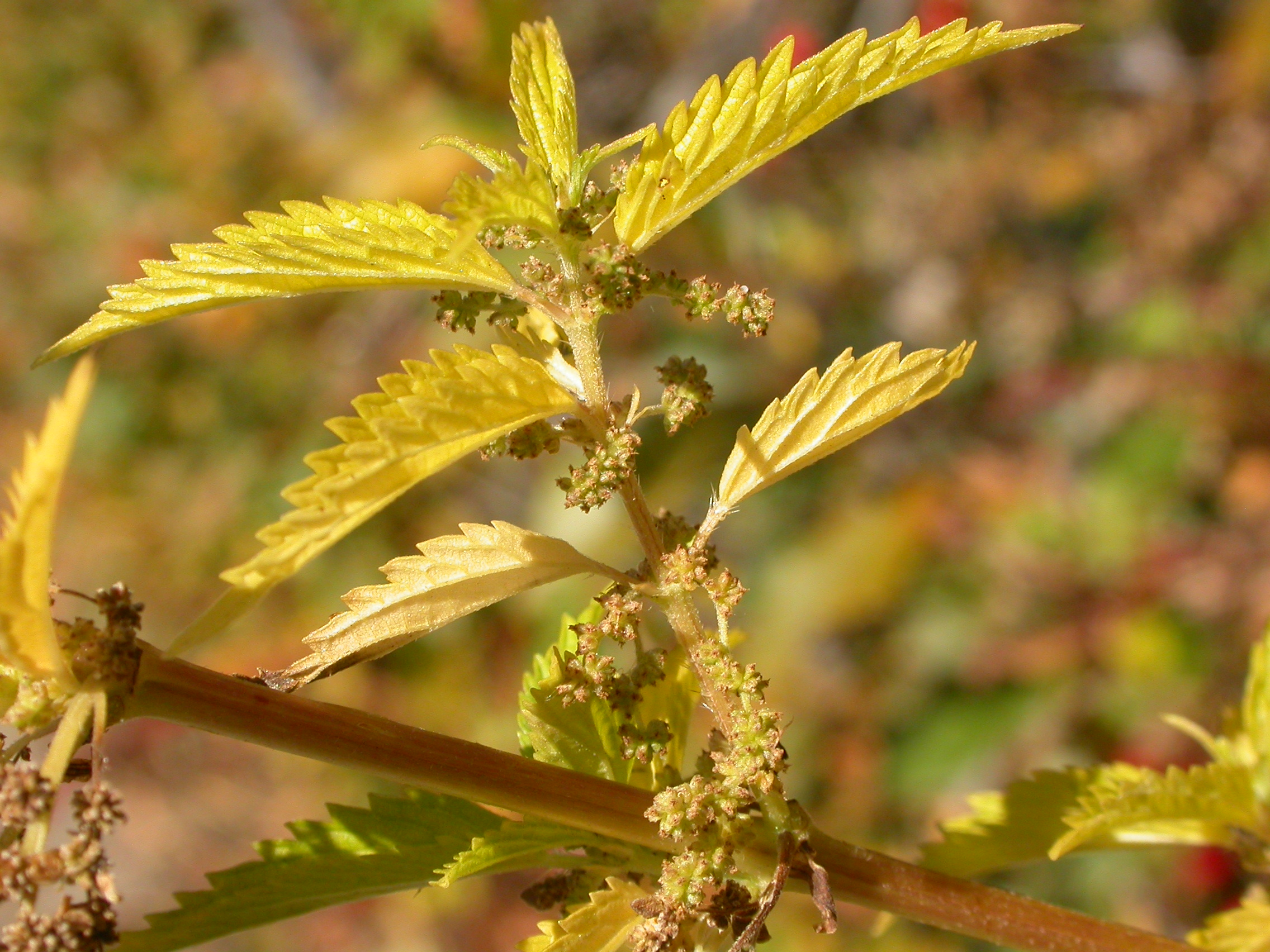

Scientific classification
- Kingdom: Plantae
- Clade: Embryophytes
- Clade: Tracheophytes
- Clade: Spermatophytes
- Clade: Angiosperms
- Clade: Eudicots
- Clade: Rosids
- Order: Rosales
- Family: Urticaceae
- Genus: Urtica
- Species: U. gracilis

Binomial name
- Urtica gracilis Aiton

Synonyms
- Urtica dioica subsp. gracilis (Aiton) Selander; Urtica dioica var. gracilis (Aiton) Roy L.Taylor & MacBryde

= Urtica gracilis =

Species of flowering plant

Urtica gracilis, commonly known as the slender nettle, tall nettle, or American stinging nettle, is a perennial plant without woody stems that is well known for the unpleasant stinging hairs on its leaves and stems. It is native to much of the North American continent from Guatemala northwards and temperate areas of South America. It is easily confused with the visually very similar Eurasian species Urtica dioica and is still listed in some resources as a subspecies of this plant. However, genetic analysis and experiments show that they are genetically distinct.

== Description ==
Urtica gracilis is a perennial plant, one that regrows for many years, with stems that die back to the ground in winter (herbaceous plant). It spreads both by wind borne seeds and by rhizomes, often forming dense stands in favorable conditions. Plants can be between 50 centimeters and 3 meters in height with stems that can be simple or branched. Stems will vary in between being smooth and covered in stiff hairs (glabrous to strigose), but have few of the stinging hairs the plant is known for.

The leaves of Urtica gracilis are variable, elliptic, lanceolate, or ovate, and 6–20 cm long by 2–13 cm across, with a base that can either be rounded or shaped like a heart (rounded to cordate). The leaf edges have coarse teeth, sometimes with smaller teeth within each larger tooth (doubly serrate) and the ends are pointed. The underside of the leaves are covered in the stinging hairs that the species is so well known for, but the upper surface only rarely has a few stinging hairs and is more often smooth or covered in non-stinging fine hairs (puberulent).

Urtica gracilis has a flowering panicle, a much branched flowering stem with multiple flowers on short stems. The flowers are unisexual, each one only having either female pistils or male stamens. Mostly plants will have both genders of flowers. The flowers are not large or showy.

== Habitat ==
This species habitat is in high and low forested floodplains, gravel and sand bars in streams.

== Taxonomy ==
The first scientific description of Urtica gracilis was published by William Aiton in 1789. While this was accepted for a time the visual similarity caused botanical sources like George Neville Jones's 1945 Flora of Illinois to only list Urtica dioica. In 2014 the paper "Weeding the Nettles II" was published in the journal Phytotaxa. It showed the North American nettles to be a unified group that is genetically distinct As of 2023 the major botanical source Plants of the World Online (POWO) lists Urtica gracilis as a valid species. However, the USDA Natural Resources Conservation Service PLANTS database (PLANTS) continues to list it as the subspecies Urtica dioica ssp. gracilis credited to Sten Selander.

=== Subspecies ===
There are 5 recognized subspecies or varieties of Urtica gracilis according to POWO as of 2023. Four of them were formerly recognized at different times as other subspecies, varieties, or species.

Scientific name	Authority	Synonyms
Urtica gracilis subsp. aquatica	(Liebm.) Weigend	Urtica aquatica, Urtica mexicana, Urtica serra
Urtica gracilis subsp. gracilis		Urtica californica, Urtica cardiophylla, Urtica dioica var. angustifolia, Urtica dioica var. californica, Urtica dioica var. lyallii, Urtica dioica var. procera, Urtica gracilis var. latifolia, Urtica lyallii, Urtica lyallii var. californica, Urtica procera, Urtica strigosissima, Urtica viridis
Urtica gracilis subsp. holosericea	(Nutt.) W.A.Weber	Urtica breweri, Urtica dioica subsp. holosericea, Urtica dioica var. holosericea, Urtica gracilis var. holosericea, Urtica dioica var. occidentalis, Urtica gracilis f. densa, Urtica gracilis var. densa, Urtica gracilis var. greenei, Urtica gracilis f. greenei, Urtica holosericea, Urtica trachycarpa
Urtica gracilis subsp. incaica	Weigend	
Urtica gracilis subsp. mollis	(Steud.) Weigend	Urtica buchtienii, Urtica dioica var. mollis, Urtica dioica var. diplotricha, Urtica diplotricha, Urtica mollis

== Range ==
Urtica gracilis is native to the Americas and is recorded by POWO as growing in most of North America including every state of Mexico, every province and territory of Canada except Nunavut, and all but four states, Hawaii, Florida, South Carolina, and Arkansas in America. In Central America it is only recorded as growing in Guatemala. In South America it is limited to the more temperate areas in the countries of Peru, Chile, and Argentina.

== Known hazards ==
As every other species of Urtica, it has stinging hairs that irritate the skin. This is prevented by cooking it and using the young leaves instead, because older leaves develop cystoliths which act as an irritant to the kidneys.

== Uses ==
=== Culinary ===
Urtica gracillis has a flavor similar to spinach when cooked. Young plants were harvested by indigenous peoples of the Americas and used as a cooked plant in spring when other food plants were scarce. Soaking stinging nettles in water or cooking removes the stinging chemicals from the plant, which allows them to be handled and eaten without injury.

=== Textile ===
"Urtica Gracilis" is traditionally used by Coast Salish peoples as a source of fibre for ropes, fishing nets, baskets, and clothing. It was described by some British explorers as "Vancouver Island's hemp."
