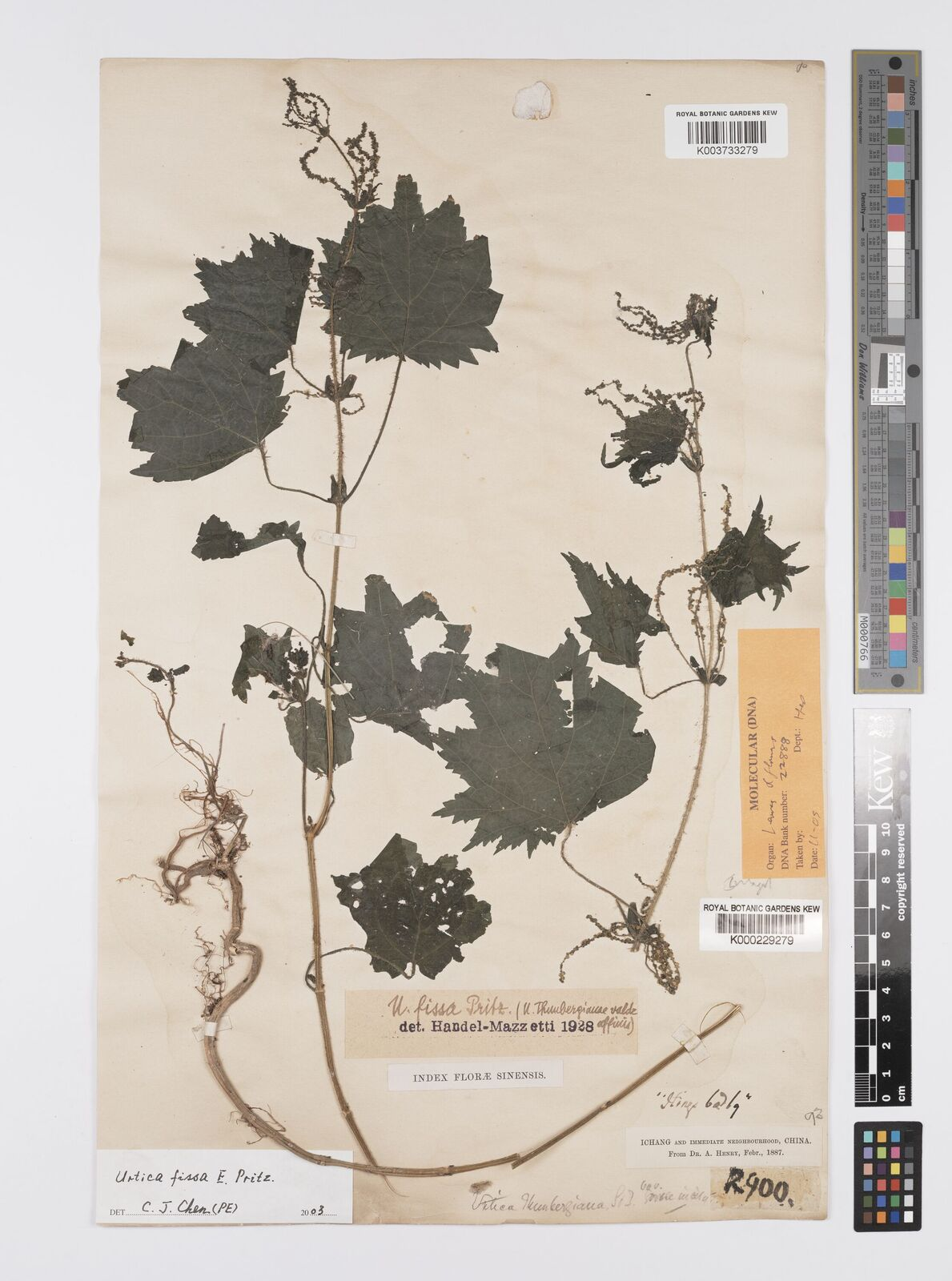

Scientific classification
- Kingdom: Plantae
- Clade: Tracheophytes
- Clade: Angiosperms
- Clade: Eudicots
- Clade: Rosids
- Order: Rosales
- Family: Urticaceae
- Genus: Urtica
- Species: U. fissa

Binomial name
- Urtica fissa E.Pritz.

= Urtica fissa =

Species of flowering plant

Urtica fissa is an upright perennial herb native to streams and rainforest of China.

It is monoecious, has both sex organs, and rarely has only one sex organ (dioecious)

== Growth ==
Scrub nettle leaves are triangular and opposite, 5–12 centimetres (2.0–4.7 in) long, with serrated margins and stinging hairs.
