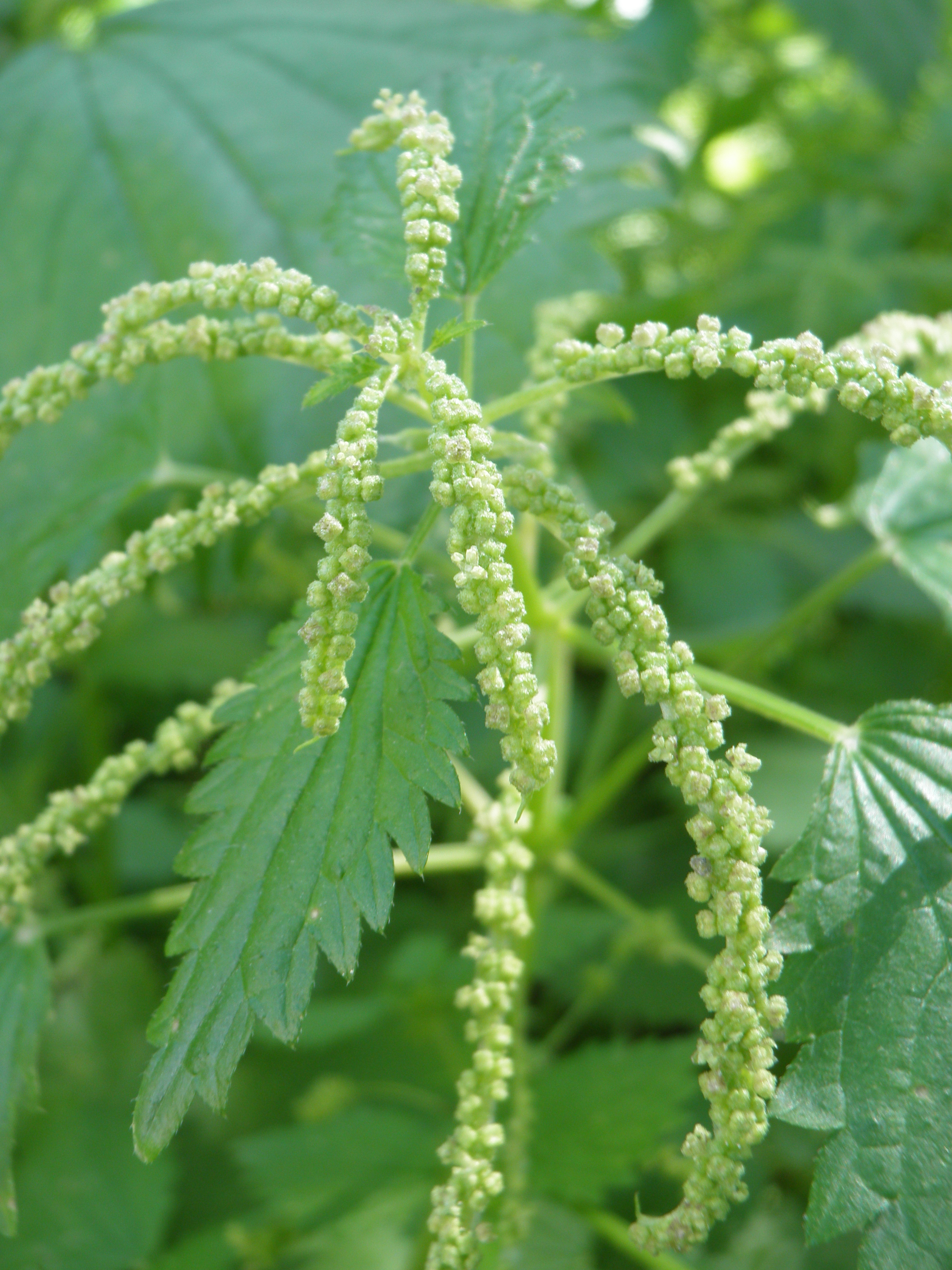

Scientific classification
- Kingdom: Plantae
- Clade: Tracheophytes
- Clade: Angiosperms
- Clade: Eudicots
- Clade: Rosids
- Order: Rosales
- Family: Urticaceae
- Genus: Urtica
- Species: U. membranacea

Binomial name
- Urtica membranacea Poir.

Synonyms
- Urtica dubia

= Urtica membranacea =

Species of plant

Urtica membranacea is a species of annual herb in the family Urticaceae native to the Mediterranean Basin. They have a self-supporting growth form and simple, broad leaves. Individuals can grow to 39 cm tall.

== Sources ==
This article incorporates text from a free content work. Licensed under CC0 (license statement/permission). Text taken from Urtica membranacea. Encyclopedia of Life.
