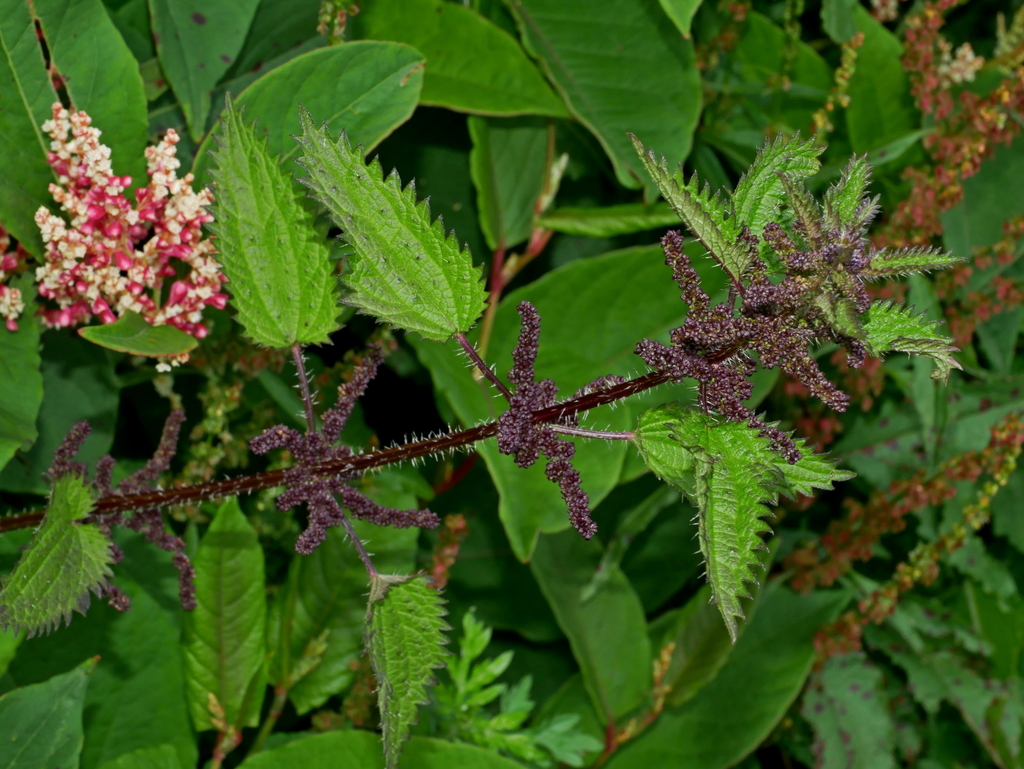

Scientific classification
- Kingdom: Plantae
- Clade: Tracheophytes
- Clade: Angiosperms
- Clade: Eudicots
- Clade: Rosids
- Order: Rosales
- Family: Urticaceae
- Genus: Urtica
- Species: U. taiwaniana

Binomial name
- Urtica taiwaniana S.S.Ying

= Urtica taiwaniana =

Species of flowering plant

Urtica taiwaniana is a species of plant in the family Urticaceae. It is endemic to Taiwan. It is a perennial or rhizomatous geophyte that grows primarily in the temperate biome.
