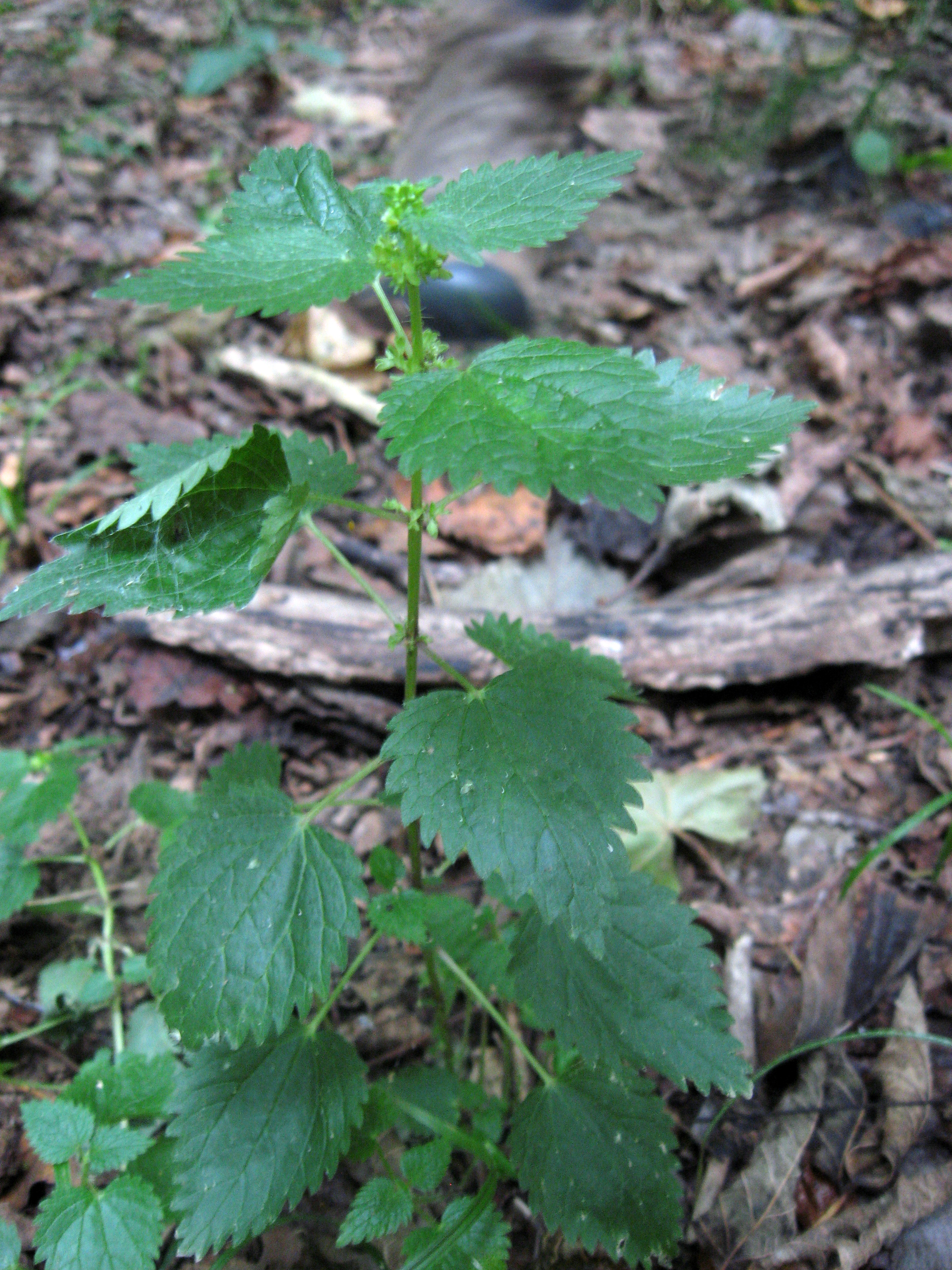

Scientific classification
- Kingdom: Plantae
- Clade: Tracheophytes
- Clade: Angiosperms
- Clade: Eudicots
- Clade: Rosids
- Order: Rosales
- Family: Urticaceae
- Genus: Urtica
- Species: U. chamaedryoides

Binomial name
- Urtica chamaedryoides Pursh

= Urtica chamaedryoides =

Species of flowering plant

Urtica chamaedryoides (commonly called heartleaf nettle) is a species of flowering plant in the family Urticaceae. It is native to the Southeastern United States and northern Mexico, where it is often found in wooded areas that are rich and moist. In some areas of Florida, it has become a lawn and pasture weed.

Like other nettles, Urtica chamaedryoides produces stinging hairs that cause an insect-venom like sting when touched. It produces small green flowers that are wind pollinated.
