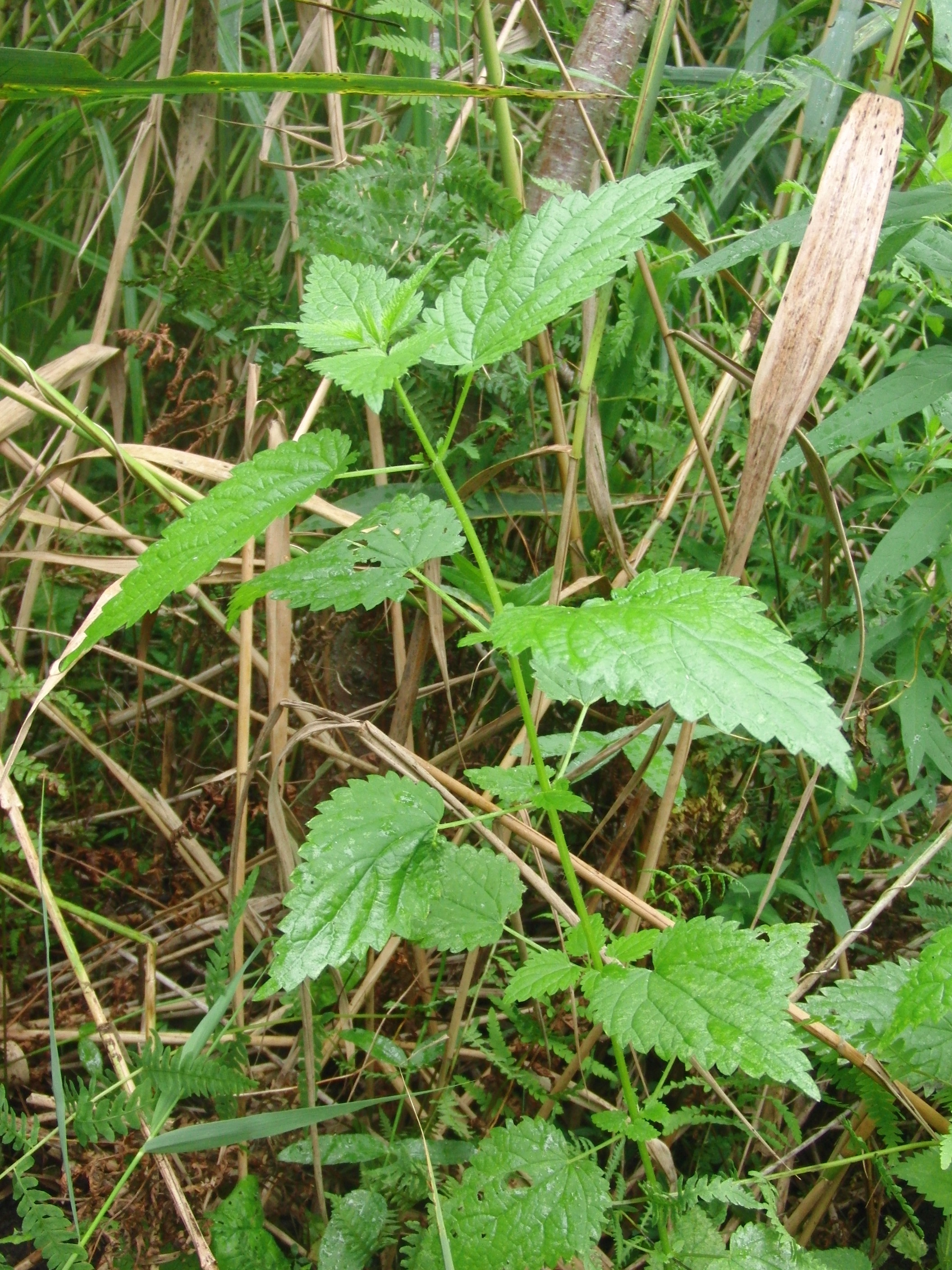
- Urtica kioviensis

Scientific classification
- Kingdom: Plantae
- Clade: Tracheophytes
- Clade: Angiosperms
- Clade: Eudicots
- Clade: Rosids
- Order: Rosales
- Family: Urticaceae
- Genus: Urtica
- Species: U. kioviensis

Binomial name
- Urtica kioviensis Rogow.

= Urtica kioviensis =

Species of plant

Urtica kioviensis is a species of plant in the Urticaceae family.

== Description ==
Urtica kioviensis grows from 0.4 meters to 1.5 meters and it flowers from July to September. The flower color is green and leaf arrangement is opposite.

== Distribution and habitat ==
Urtica kioviensis grows in most of Europe, Jordan, Palestine and Israel. It is a perennial or helophyte and grows primarily in the temperate biome.
