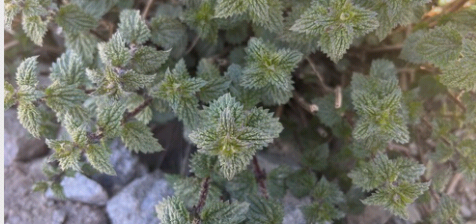
- In Ladakh

Scientific classification
- Kingdom: Plantae
- Clade: Tracheophytes
- Clade: Angiosperms
- Clade: Eudicots
- Clade: Rosids
- Order: Rosales
- Family: Urticaceae
- Genus: Urtica
- Species: U. hyperborea

Binomial name
- Urtica hyperborea Jacquem. ex Wedd.

= Urtica hyperborea =

Species of flowering plant

Urtica hyperborea is a species of Urtica in the nettle family Urticaceae. It is a perennial or rhizomatous geophyte.
