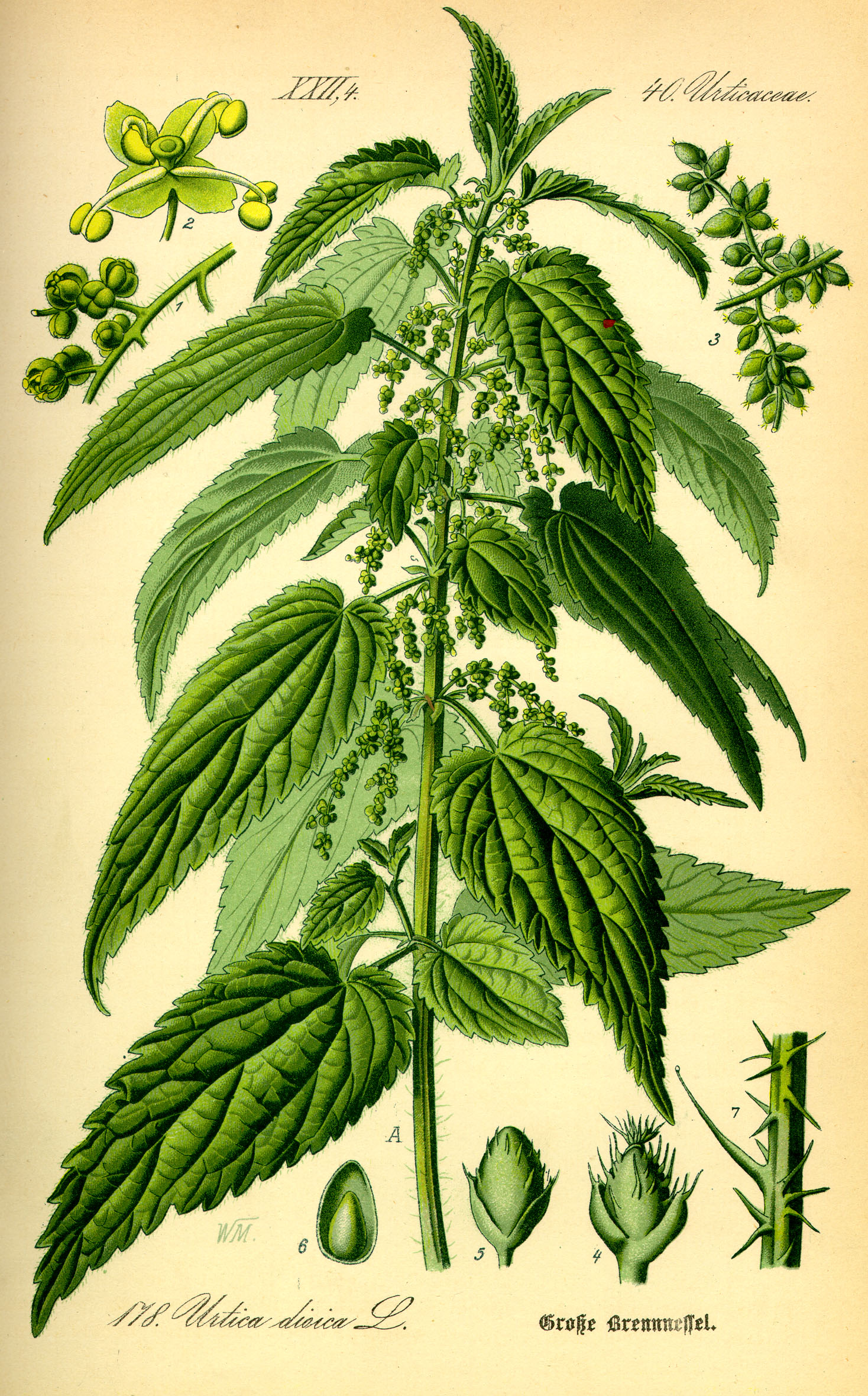
- Stinging nettle (Urtica dioica)

Scientific classification
- Kingdom: Plantae
- Clade: Tracheophytes
- Clade: Angiosperms
- Clade: Eudicots
- Clade: Rosids
- Order: Rosales
- Family: Urticaceae
- Tribe: Urticeae
- Genus: Urtica; L.

Species
- See text

Synonyms
- Hesperocnide

= Urtica =

Urtica Temporal range: Miocene–Recent

Genus of flowering plants

Urtica is a genus of flowering plants in the family Urticaceae. Many species have stinging hairs and may be called nettles or stinging nettles (the latter name applying particularly to U. dioica). The generic name Urtica derives from the Latin for 'sting'.

Due to the stinging hairs, Urtica are rarely eaten by herbivores, but provide shelter for insects. The fiber has historically been used by humans, and cooking preparations exist.

== Description ==
Urtica species grow as annuals or perennial herbaceous plants, rarely shrubs. They can reach, depending on the type, location and nutrient status, a height of 10–300 centimetres (4–118 inches). The perennial species have underground rhizomes. The green parts have stinging hairs. Their often quadrangular stems are unbranched or branched, erect, ascending or spreading.

Most leaves and stalks are arranged across opposite sides of the stem. The leaf blades are elliptic, lanceolate, ovate or circular. The leaf blades usually have three to five, rarely up to seven veins. The leaf margin is usually serrate to more or less coarsely toothed. The often-lasting bracts are free or fused to each other. The cystoliths are extended to more or less rounded.

In 1874, while in Collioure (south of France), French botanist Charles Naudin discovered that a strong wind lasting 24 hours rendered the stinging hairs of nettles harmless for an entire week.

== Taxonomy ==
=== Phylogeny ===
The last common ancestor of the genus originated in Eurasia, with fossils being known from the Miocene of Germany and Russia, subsequently dispersing worldwide. Several species of the genus have undergone long distance oceanic dispersal, such as Hesperocnide sandwicensis (native to Hawaii) and Urtica ferox (native to New Zealand).

=== Species ===
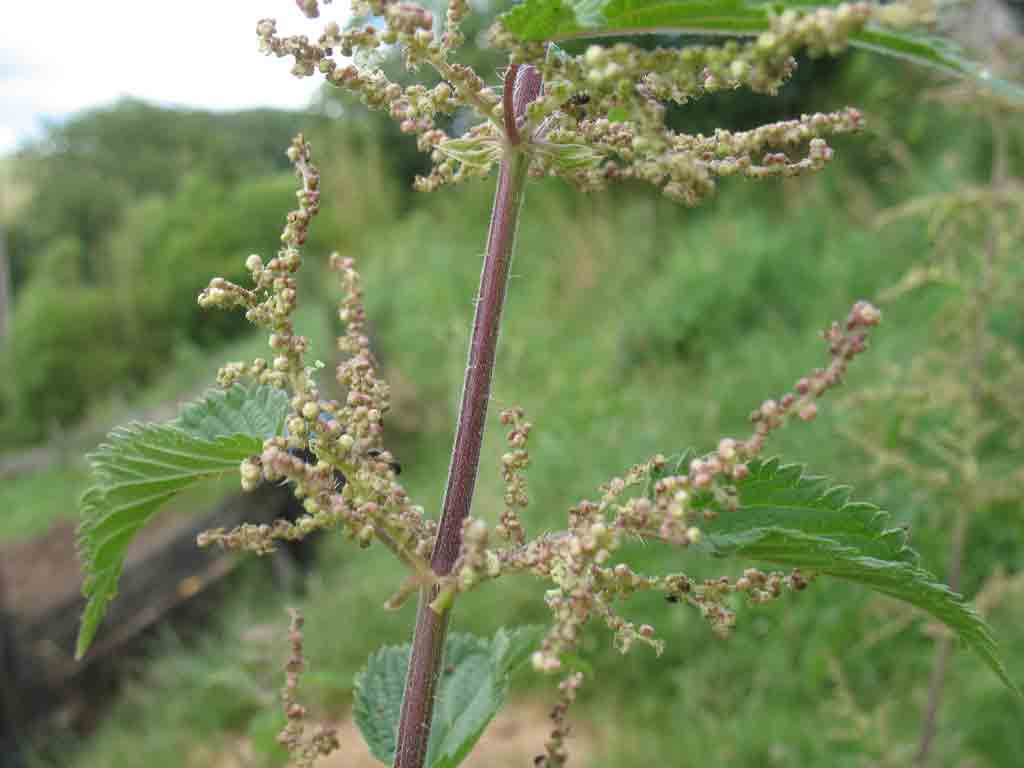
Detail of a male flowering stinging nettle

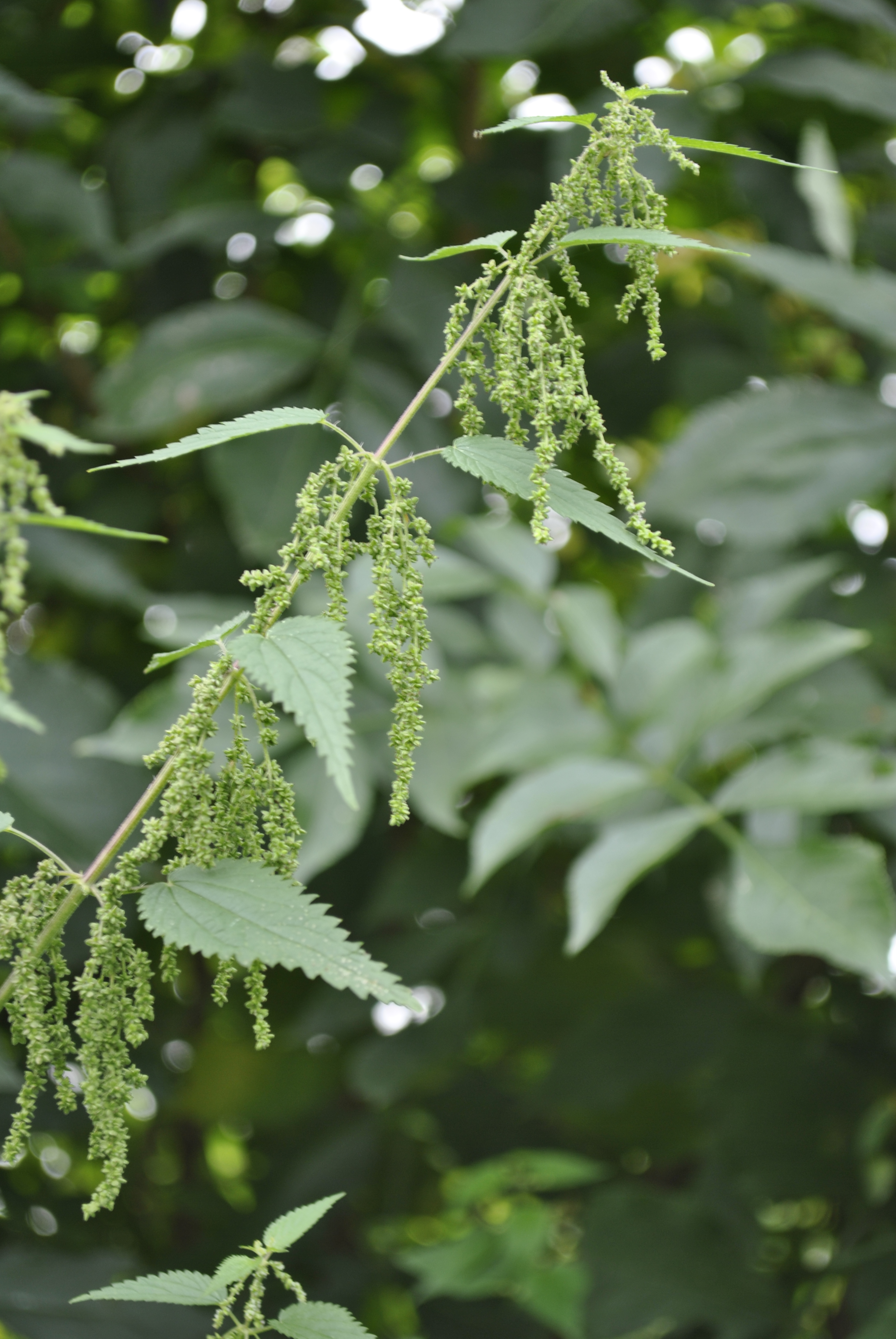
Detail of female flowering stinging nettle

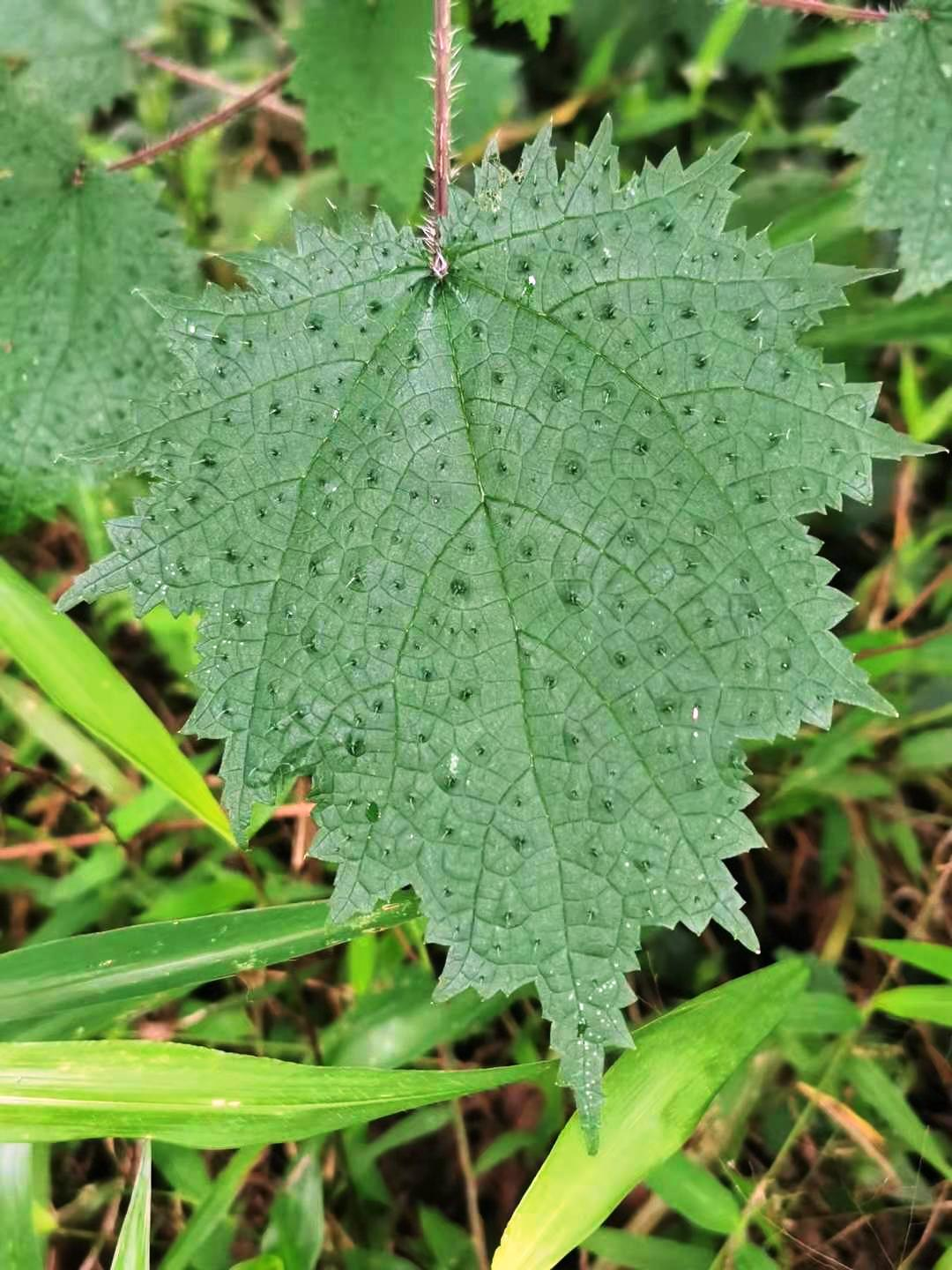
The dotted bumps on the leaves of Urtica thunbergiana

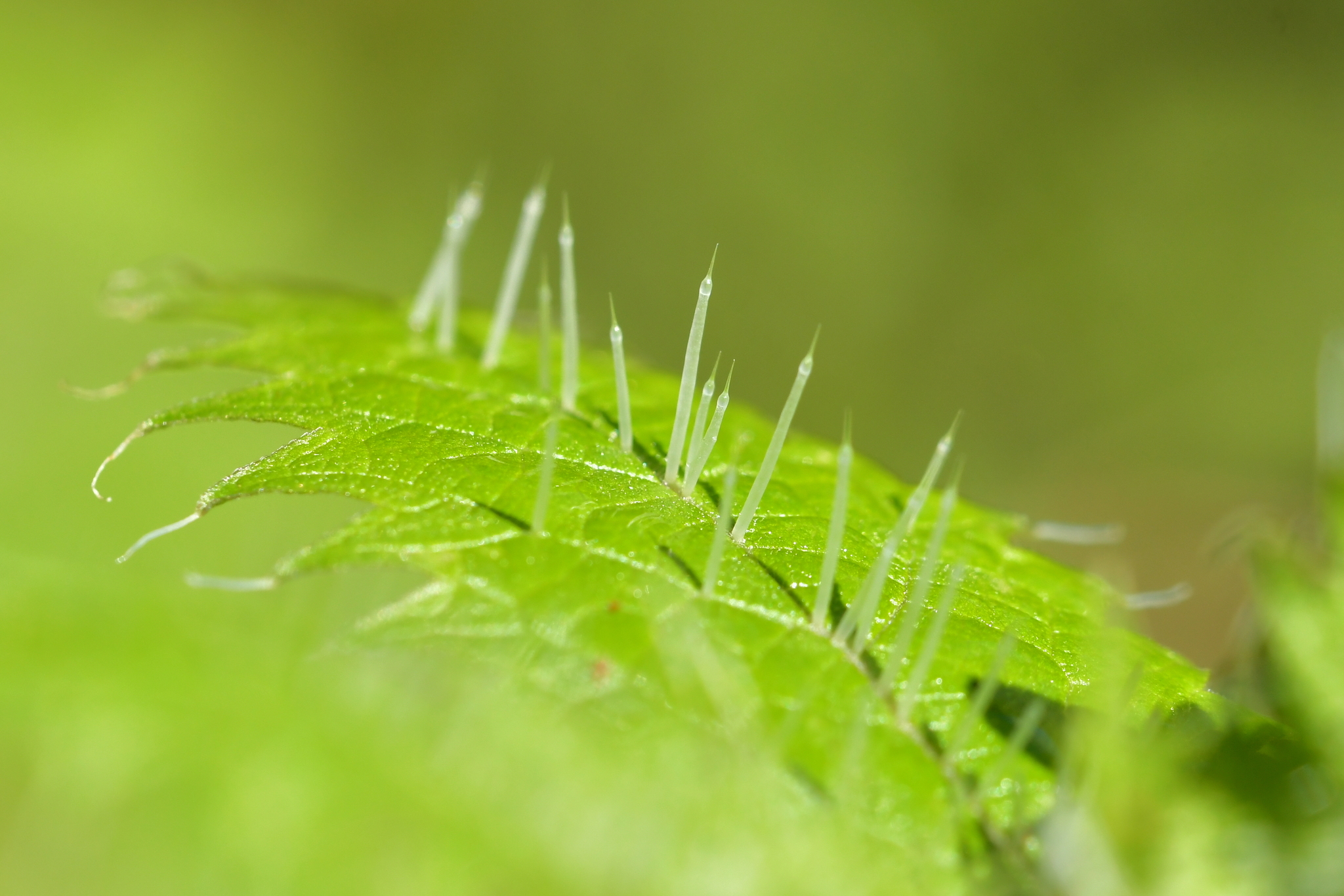
The stinging hairs of Urtica ferox

A large number of species included within the genus in the older literature are now recognised as synonyms of Urtica dioica. Some of these taxa are still recognised as subspecies. Genetic evidence indicates that the two species of Hesperocnide are part of this genus.

Species in the genus Urtica accepted by Plants of the World Online:

- Urtica ardens Link
- Urtica aspera Petrie
- Urtica atrichocaulis (Hand.-Mazz.) C.J.Chen
- Urtica atrovirens Req. ex Loisel.
- Urtica australis Hook.f.
- Urtica ballotifolia Wedd.
- Urtica berteroana Phil.
- Urtica bianorii (Knoche) Paiva
- Urtica bracteola Charit.
- Urtica bullata Blume
- Urtica cannabina L.
- Urtica chamaedryoides Pursh
- Urtica chengkouensis W.T.Wang
- Urtica circularis (Hicken) Sorarú
- Urtica cypria (H.Lindb.) Hand
- Urtica dioica L.
- Urtica domingensis Urb.
- Urtica echinata Benth.
- Urtica ferox G.Forst.
- Urtica fissa E.Pritz.
- Urtica flabellata Kunth
- Urtica fragilis J.Thiébaut
- Urtica glomeruliflora Steud.
- Urtica gracilenta Greene
- Urtica gracilis Aiton
- Urtica helanshanica W.Z.Di & W.B.Liao
- Urtica himalayensis Kunth & C.D.Bouché
- Urtica hyperborea Jacquem. ex Wedd.
- Urtica incisa Poir.
- Urtica kioviensis Rogow.
- Urtica lalibertadensis Weigend
- Urtica laurifolia Poir.
- Urtica leptophylla Kunth
- Urtica lilloi (Hauman) Geltman
- Urtica lobata E.Mey. ex Blume
- Urtica macbridei Killip
- Urtica magellanica Juss. ex Poir.
- Urtica mairei H.Lév.
- Urtica malipoensis W.T.Wang
- Urtica masafuerae Phil.
- Urtica massaica Mildbr.
- Urtica membranacea Poir. ex Savigny
- Urtica membranifolia C.J.Chen
- Urtica mexicana Liebm.
- Urtica morifolia Poir.
- Urtica neubaueri Chrtek
- Urtica × oblongata W.D.J.Koch ex Maly
- Urtica papuana Zandee
- Urtica parviflora Roxb.
- Urtica perconfusa Grosse-Veldm. & Weigend
- Urtica peruviana Geltman
- Urtica pilulifera L.
- Urtica platyphylla Wedd.
- Urtica portosanctana Press
- Urtica praetermissa V.W.Steinm.
- Urtica pseudomagellanica Geltman
- Urtica rupestris Guss.
- Urtica sansibarica Engl.
- Urtica simensis Hochst. ex A.Rich.
- Urtica spatulata Sm.
- Urtica spirealis Blume
- Urtica stachyoides Webb & Berthel.
- Urtica subincisa Benth.
- Urtica sykesii Grosse-Veldm. & Weigend
- Urtica taiwaniana S.S.Ying
- Urtica thunbergiana Siebold & Zucc.
- Urtica triangularis Hand.-Mazz.
- Urtica trichantha (Wedd.) Acevedo & L.E.Navas
- Urtica urens L.
- Urtica urentivelutina Weigend

=== Etymology ===
The generic name Urtica derives from the Latin for 'sting'.

== Ecology ==
Due to the stinging hairs, Urtica species are rarely eaten by herbivores, but provide shelter for insects such as aphids, butterfly larvae, and moths. They are also consumed by caterpillars of numerous Lepidoptera (butterflies and moths), such as the tortrix moth Syricoris lacunana and several Nymphalidae, e.g. Vanessa atalanta, a red admiral butterfly.

== Toxicity ==
Besides the stinging hairs in general, in New Zealand U. ferox is classified as a poisonous plant, most commonly upon skin contact.

== Uses ==
Fabric woven of nettle fiber was found in burial sites in Denmark dating to the Bronze Age, and in clothing fabric, sailcloth, fishing nets, and paper via the process called retting (microbial enzymatic degradation, similar to linen processing). Other processing methods include mechanical and chemical.

=== Culinary ===
Urtica is an ingredient in soups, omelettes, banitsa, purée, and other dishes. In Mazandaran, northern Iran, a soup (Āsh) is made using this plant. Nettles were used in traditional practices to make nettle tea, juice, and ale, and to preserve cheeses, such as in Cornish Yarg.

== In folklore ==
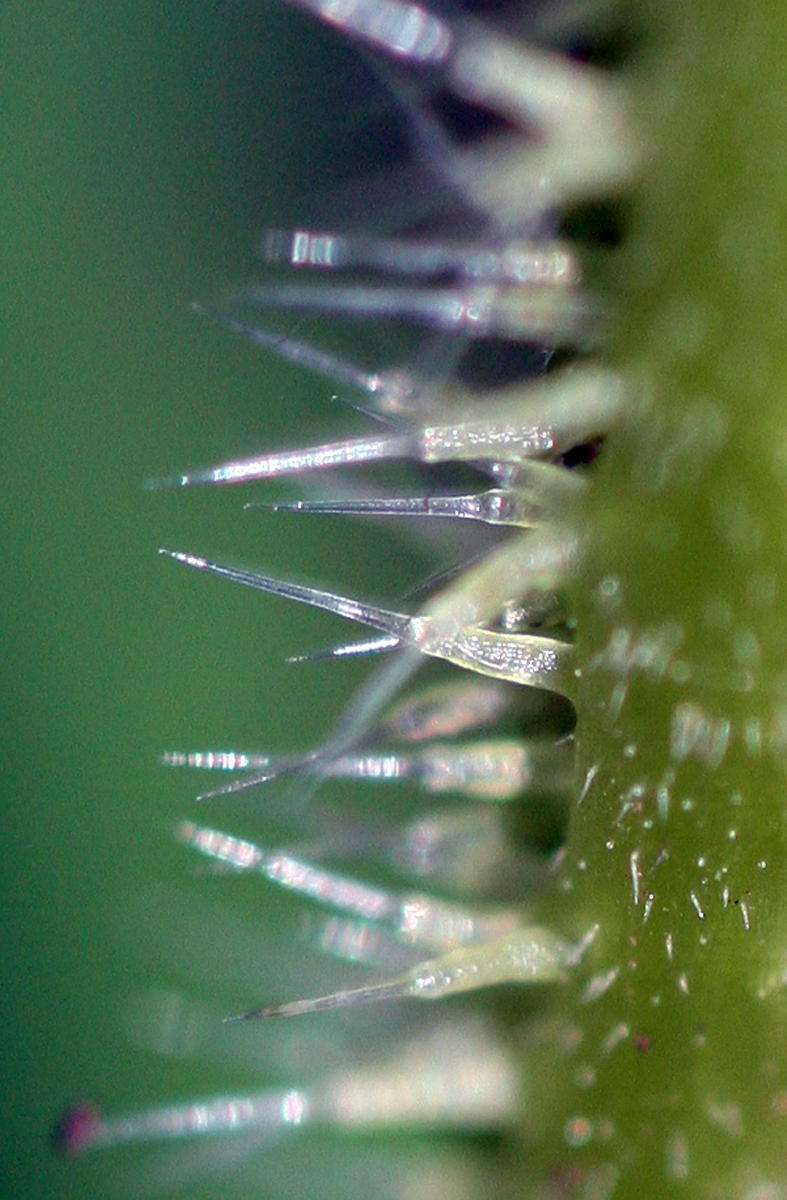
The stinging hairs of Urtica dioica

=== Asian ===
Milarepa, the Tibetan ascetic and saint, was reputed to have survived his decades of solitary meditation by subsisting on nothing but nettles; his hair and skin turned green, and he lived to the age of 83.

=== Caribbean ===
The Caribbean trickster figure Anansi appears in a story about nettles, in which he has to chop down a huge nettle patch in order to win the hand of the king's daughter.

=== European ===
An old Scots rhyme about the nettle:

Gin ye be for lang kail coo the nettle, stoo the nettle
Gin ye be for lang kail coo the nettle early
Coo it laich, coo it sune, coo it in the month o' June
Stoo it ere it's in the bloom, coo the nettle early
Coo it by the auld wa's, coo it where the sun ne'er fa's
Stoo it when the day daws, coo the nettle early.

Coo, cow, and stoo are all Scottish for cut back or crop (although, curiously, another meaning of "stoo" is to throb or ache), while "laich" means short or low to the ground. Given the repetition of "early," presumably this is advice to harvest nettles first thing in the morning and to cut them back hard (which seems to contradict the advice of the Royal Horticultural Society). Alternatively, it may be recommending harvesting early in the year before the plants grow tall, as they become tough and stringy later.

The English figure of speech "grasp the nettle", meaning to nerve oneself to tackle a difficult task, stems from a belief that nettles actually sting less if gripped tightly. This belief gave rise to a poem by Aaron Hill:

Tender-handed, stroke a nettle,
And it stings you for your pains.
Grasp it like a man of mettle,
And it soft as silk remains.
'Tis the same, with common natures,
Use ’em kindly, they rebel:
But, be rough as Nutmeg-graters,
And the rogues obey you well.

In Hans Christian Andersen's fairy-tale "The Wild Swans," the princess had to weave coats of nettles to break the spell on her brothers.

In the Brothers Grimm's fairy-tale "Maid Maleen", the princess and her maid must subsist on raw nettles while fleeing their war-ravaged kingdom. While standing in for the false bride during the wedding procession, she speaks to a nettle plant (which later proves her identity):

Oh, nettle-plant,
Little nettle-plant,
What dost thou here alone?
I have known the time
When I ate thee unboiled,
When I ate thee unroasted.

== In toponymy ==
The name of the village Kichkalnya (Republic of Tatarstan, Russia) derives from the Tatar word «qıçıtqan» (nettle); in Tatar, the original form «Qıçıtqanlı» means “place where nettles grow”.
