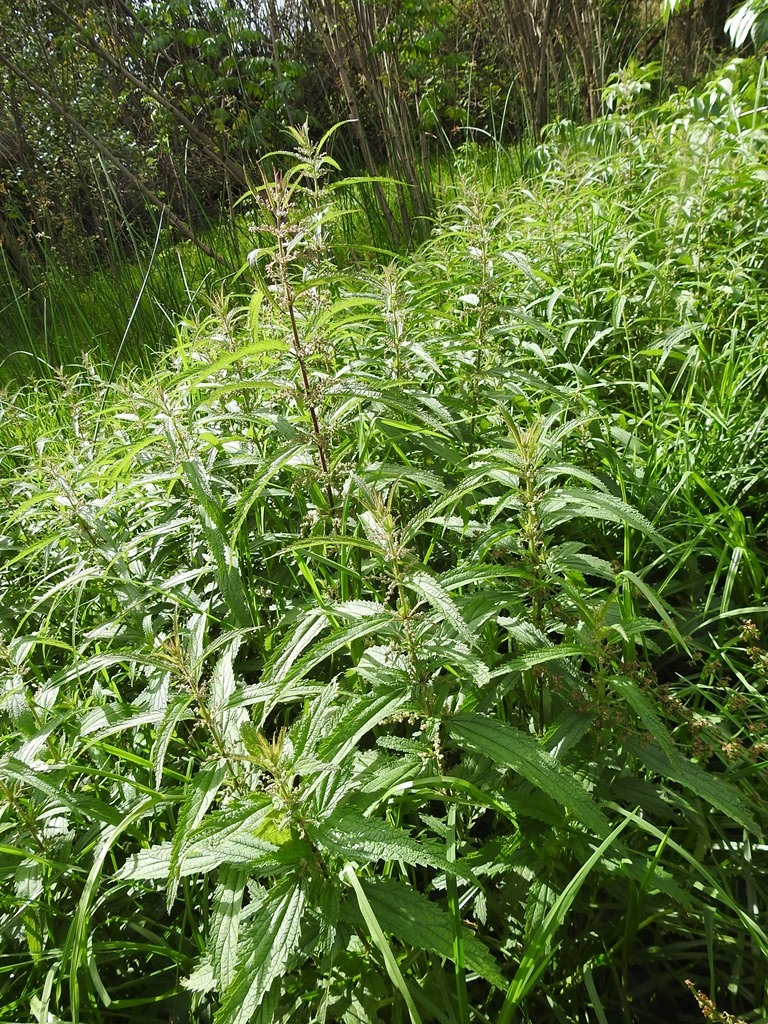

Scientific classification
- Kingdom: Plantae
- Clade: Tracheophytes
- Clade: Angiosperms
- Clade: Eudicots
- Clade: Rosids
- Order: Rosales
- Family: Urticaceae
- Genus: Urtica
- Species: U. mexicana

Binomial name
- Urtica mexicana Liebm.

= Urtica mexicana =

Species of plant

Urtica mexicana is a species of nettle in the family Urticaceae.

== Description ==
A species of nettle that grows primarily in the subtropical biome.

== Distribution ==
It is native to Mexico and Guatemala.
