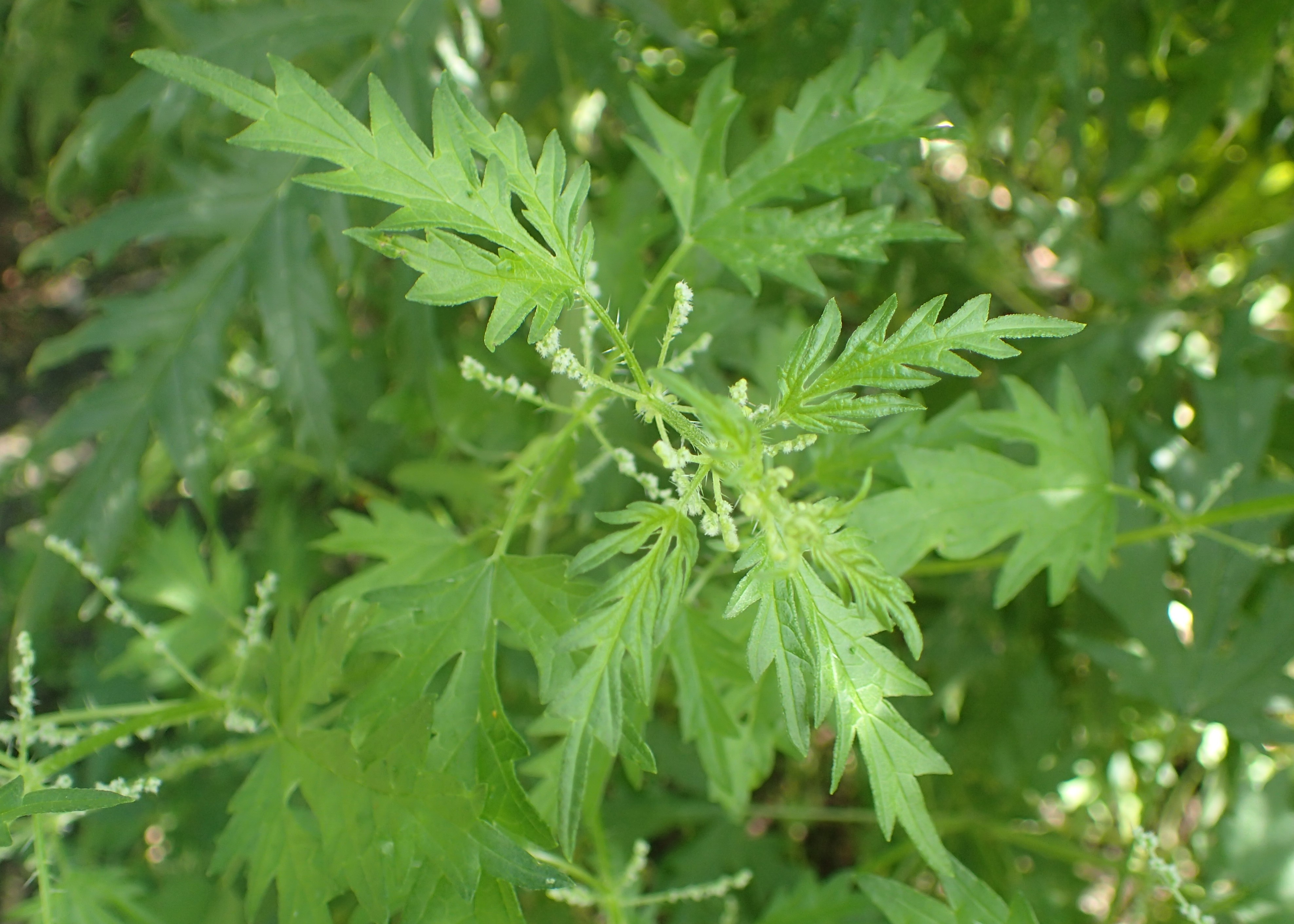
- At the University of Wrocław Botanical Garden
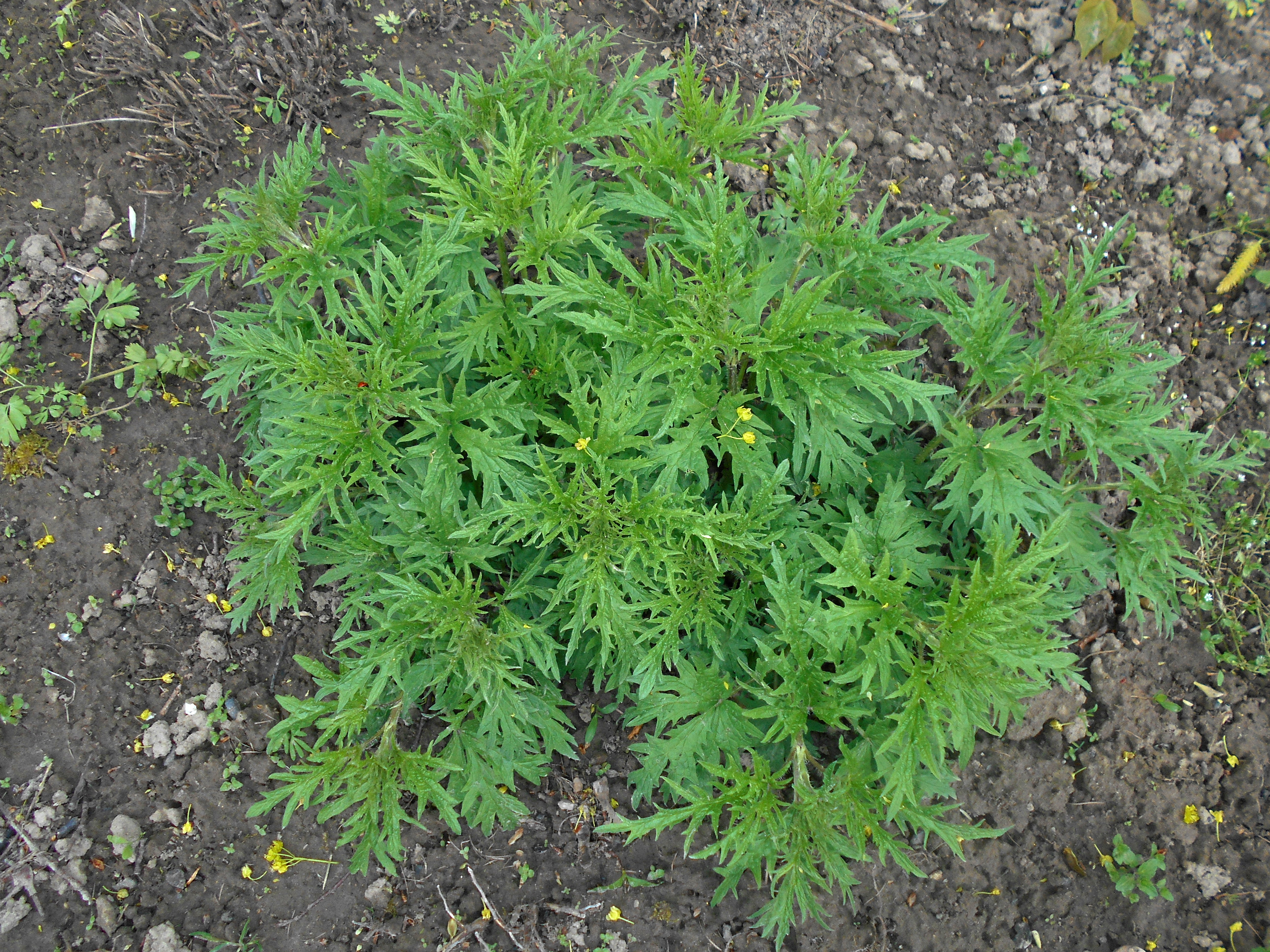
- Habit

Scientific classification
- Kingdom: Plantae
- Clade: Tracheophytes
- Clade: Angiosperms
- Clade: Eudicots
- Clade: Rosids
- Order: Rosales
- Family: Urticaceae
- Genus: Urtica
- Species: U. cannabina

Binomial name
- Urtica cannabina L.

Synonyms
- Urtica cannabina f. angustiloba Y.C.Chu

= Urtica cannabina =

Species of plant

Urtica cannabina, the hemp nettle, is a species of flowering plant in the family Urticaceae. It is native to Central Asia, Siberia, Mongolia, and northern and central China, and has been introduced to Ukraine, European Russia, and the Russian Far East. A perennial herb typically 50 to 150 cm (20 to 59 in) tall, it thrives in a wide variety of habitats, including anthropogenically disturbed ones. Attempts are being made in China to cultivate it for its fiber.
