= Dipterina imbriferana =

Scientific classification
- Kingdom: Animalia
- Phylum: Arthropoda
- Clade: Pancrustacea
- Class: Insecta
- Order: Lepidoptera
- Family: Tortricidae
- Genus: Dipterina
- Species: D. imbriferana

Binomial name
- Dipterina imbriferana Meyrick, 1881

Synonyms
- Cnephasia imbriferana (Meyrick, 1881)

Species of moth endemic to New Zealand

Dipterina imbriferana is a species of moth in the family Tortricidae. It was first described by Edward Meyrick in 1881. This species is endemic to New Zealand and has been observed throughout the North and South Islands. D. imbriferana inhabits native forest and bush. The larval host of this species is Fuchsia excorticata. Larvae feed on the dead branches and ripe berries of that tree. They have also been observed feeding on the fruits of Melicytus ramiflorus and reared to maturity from a dead twig of Aristotelia serrata. They pupate in the burrows left in the branches by their feeding.

Adults are on the wing from November until April and are attracted to light. This species can be distinguished from similar species by its whitish ground colour, grey markings, and the angulated central stripe across the forewings. However adults are variable in appearance with some specimens having extremely faint bands on the forewings and hindwings that can vary in colour from pale grey to pale grey-ochreous.

== Taxonomy ==
This species was first described by Edward Meyrick in 1881. In 1911 Meyrick synonymised Dipterina into Cnephasia and as a result this moth became known as Cnephasia imbriferana. George Hudson discussed and illustrated this species under that name in his 1928 book The butterflies and moths of New Zealand. In 1966 John S. Dugdale reexamined this species and confirmed its placement in the genus Dipterina. Dugdale again confirmed this placement in 1988. The male lectotype, collected in Wellington by Meyrick, is held at the Natural History Museum, London.

== Description ==
D. imbriferana at rest.

Specimen showing variation.

Meyrick described the adults of this species as follows:

♂♀. 4"-5 1/2". Head and palpi whitish mixed with grey. Antennae whitish. Thorax fuscous-grey, mixed with whitish on sides. Abdomen grey, sides and anal tuft whitish. Legs whitish, anterior and middle tibiae and all tarsi suffusedly banded with dark fuscous. Forewings rather elongate, costa moderately arched, hindmargin obliquely rounded; whitish, sometimes faintly clouded with grey ; costa and inner margin obscurely strigulated with fuscous-grey ; basal patch light fuscous-grey, outer edge extending from one-fourth of costa to one-fourth of inner margin, angulated in middle ; central fascia fuscous-grey, margined with dark fuscous, moderately narrow towards costa, rather broader beneath, running from middle of costa to middle of inner margin, angulated in middle ; an obscure fuscous-grey cloudy spot on anal angle ; a dark fuscous-grey spot on costa at three-fourths, connected with middle of hindmargin by an obscure line ; apex sometimes clouded with grey : cilia whitish, with a grey line near base. Hindwings grey, darker posteriorly ; cilia grey, with a darker line near base.

D. imbriferana is distinguished from other species by its whitish ground colour, grey markings, and the angulated central stripe across the forewings. It can can be variable in appearance. In some specimens the bands on the forewings can be extremely faint and the hindwings can vary in colour from pale grey to pale grey-ochreous.

The pupa is between 8 and 10 mm in length and is longer than it is wide. The pupa is enclosed in a slight cocoon made of wood fragments, is silk lined, and is usually formed in one of the old burrows made by the larva.

Hudson described the larva of this species as follows:

The larva, which feeds in the dead branches of Fuchsia excorticata, is about three-sixteenths of an inch in length, very stout, slightly tapering posteriorly. The head is large brownish-green highly polished; the second segment has a shining brownish-green dorsal plate; the rest of the body is pale green; the prolegs are very short; there is a large blackish-green spot on the penultimate segment.

== Distribution ==
This species is endemic to New Zealand. It is found in both the North and South Islands.

== Habitat and hosts ==
Fuchsia excorticata.

D. imbriferana frequents native forest or scrub. The larval host is Fuchsia excorticata as larvae feed on the dead branches or the ripe fruit of that tree. Larvae have also been observed feeding on the fruit of Melicytus ramiflorus and have been reared to adulthood from dead wineberry twigs.

== Behaviour ==
This species has one brood a year. The larvae inhabits the hardest portions of the wood, generally near the junction of branches, where it is much knotted. Adults can emerge from the pupa as late as the second week in March. Adults are most commonly observed on the wing from November until April and are attracted to light. They have been observed amongst dead fronds of tree ferns.

The adult rests with the wings closed flat and overlapping. The dark central patch on the dorsum of the fully exposed forewing combines with the visible portion of the same marking on the opposite wing and makes a dark spot in the middle of the insect. At the same time the antennae are concealed and only the tips of the intermediate tarsi visible. When resting in this position the moth closely resembles a small patch of grey lichen.

== Gallery ==
larva

variety of adult

variety of adult

variety of adult
