= Urtica urentivelutina =

Scientific classification
- Kingdom: Plantae
- Clade: Tracheophytes
- Clade: Angiosperms
- Clade: Eudicots
- Clade: Rosids
- Order: Rosales
- Family: Urticaceae
- Genus: Urtica
- Species: U. urentivelutina

Binomial name
- Urtica urentivelutina Weigend

Species of plant

Urtica urentivelutina is a species of the genus Urtica (often referred to as nettles), found in Peru. This species is closely related to U. macbridei, but differs in its much denser and longer indument, especially on the stipules (subglabrous in U. macbridei) and the presence of stinging hairs on the perigon of the female flowers. The leaves are densely pubescent and also irregularly bullate between the veins, which is a character not found in other Peruvian species.

== Description ==
Its liana is 35 metres (115 ft) tall from a ligneous rhizome approximately 810 millimetres (32 in) thick. Its stems are lax, with scattered stinging hairs between 1.5 and 2 millimetres (0.059 and 0.079 in) long and with a dense, white cover of simple trichomes 11.5 millimetres (0.45 in) long. Leaves are opposite, with interpetiolar stipules united in pairs but deeply incised, and completely covered with white simple trichomes appromately 0.51 millimetres (0.020 in) in length. Petioles are 24 centimetres (9.4 in) long, and their cystoliths are largely punctiform. Inflorescences are unisexual, while its fruit is ovate, approximately 1.5 millimetres (0.059 in) x 1 millimetre (0.039 in), with a very short apex, largely included in the pubescent perigon.

== Distribution ==
The species is found in Sánchez Carrión Province in La Libertad in northwestern Peru. It is found in the remnants of cloud forest vegetation.
