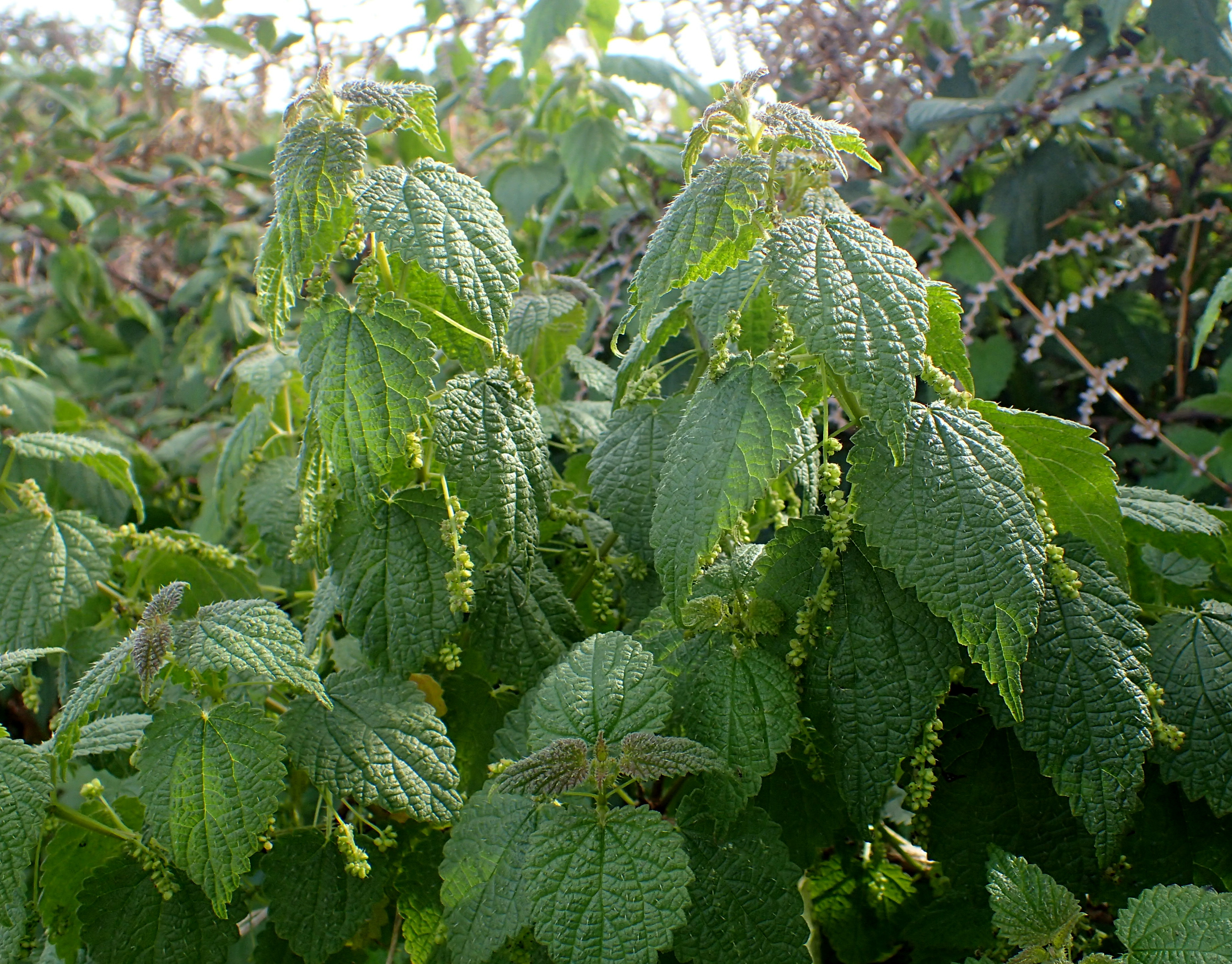

Scientific classification
- Kingdom: Plantae
- Clade: Tracheophytes
- Clade: Angiosperms
- Clade: Eudicots
- Clade: Rosids
- Order: Rosales
- Family: Urticaceae
- Genus: Urtica
- Species: U. morifolia

Binomial name
- Urtica morifolia Poir.

= Urtica morifolia =

Species of flowering plant

Urtica morifolia is a species of plant in the nettle family Urticaceae.

== Description ==
It is a perennial subshrub that grows in the subtropical biome.

== Distribution ==
It is native to the Canary Islands and Madeira. It was introduced into the Azores.
