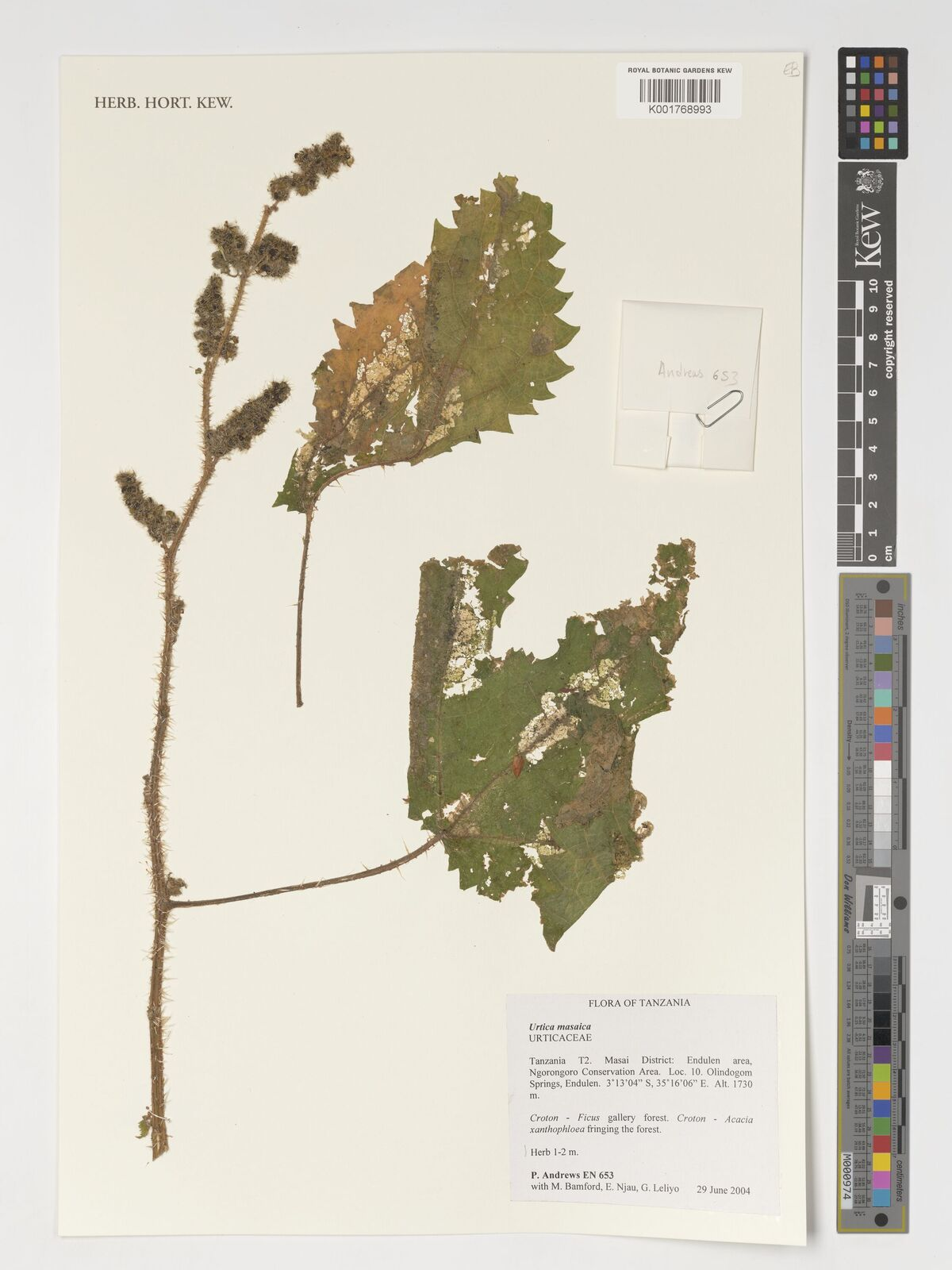

Scientific classification
- Kingdom: Plantae
- Clade: Tracheophytes
- Clade: Angiosperms
- Clade: Eudicots
- Clade: Rosids
- Order: Rosales
- Family: Urticaceae
- Genus: Urtica
- Species: U. massaica

Binomial name
- Urtica massaica Mildbr.

= Urtica massaica =

Species of flowering plant

Urtica massaica is a species of flowering plant in the nettle family Urticaceae, referred to in English as the Maasai stinging nettle or forest nettle. It is native to Africa, where it can be found in the Democratic Republic of the Congo, Burundi, Rwanda, Kenya, Uganda, and Tanzania; it is found in natural glades and clearings, frequently near houses.

This plant is a rhizomatous perennial herb up to 2 metres (6 ft 7 in) tall. It is covered in stinging hairs. The heart-shaped leaves are up to 13 centimetres (5.1 in) long by 10.5 centimetres (4.1 in) wide and have serrated edges. The plant is dioecious. The flowers are borne in panicles.

This plant is used for food and medicine in several African nations. It is used in Rwanda to treat diarrhea. The Maasai use it to treat stomach ache. They are used in Kenya to treat malaria. Other medicinal uses include treatment of fractures and venereal diseases.

The plant is also used to repel rats and to keep cattle out of crops.

Gorillas eat the plant.
