= Urtica perconfusa =

- Urtica perconfusa's leaves and stems

Conservation status
- Naturally Uncommon (NZ TCS)

Scientific classification
- Kingdom: Plantae
- Clade: Tracheophytes
- Clade: Angiosperms
- Clade: Eudicots
- Clade: Rosids
- Order: Rosales
- Family: Urticaceae
- Genus: Urtica
- Species: U. perconfusa

Binomial name
- Urtica perconfusa Grosse-Veldm. & Weigend

Species of flowering plant

Urtica perconfusa, commonly known as swamp nettle, is a species of nettle endemic to New Zealand. A member of the Urticaceae, this species is typically found growing on fertile soils in swamps. It is found in the North and South Islands. It grows in a scrambling or climbing manner. It was first described in a 2016 study as Urtica perconfusa due to its previously uncertain taxonomic status. Its specific epithet, perconfusa, reflects this confusion.

== Description ==
Urtica perconfusa (swamp nettle) is a monoecious species of herb growing up to 0.45–2.0 metres (1 foot 6 inches – 6 feet 7 inches) in height. It grows in a scrambling or climbing manner. The stinging hairs or trichomes on the stems can be 0.2–0.3 mm long. The petioles are 15–45 mm long. Leaves are 40–100 × 4–10 mm long, with trichomes 0.2–0.5 mm long. The margins are regularly toothed. Flowering occurs year-round, the inflorescences (flower clusters) the plant produces are 3–10 mm long. The fruits are rounded and 1.2–2.0 × 0.8–1.3 mm long.

== Taxonomy ==
Urtica perconfusa was first described by a 2016 study published in Phytotaxa. U. perconfusa was previously thought to be U. linearifolia or U. incisa subsp. linearifolia. There are sixty-nine species of the Urtica genus currently accepted by the Plants of the World Online taxonomic database. These species are found throughout the entire world. U. perconfusa is closely related to other New Zealand members of the genus Urtica except U. ferox. Grosse‐Veldmann et al. (2016) constructed a phylogenetic tree of the genus Urtica based on gender characteristics and genetic sequencing.

=== Etymology ===
The etymology (word origin) of U. perconfusa's genus name, Urtica, is derived from the Latin word for stinging nettles, which comes from urere, meaning to burn. The specific epithet (second part of the scientific name), perconfusa, refers to the previous confusion with the taxonomic status. The species is commonly known as 'swamp nettle'.

== Distribution ==
Urtica perconfusa is endemic to New Zealand. It is found in the North and South Islands. This species is not found further north of the central North Island. The 2023 assessment of U. perconfusa in the New Zealand Threat Classification System was "At Risk – Naturally Uncommon".

=== Habitat ===
Urtica perconfusa is typically found on fertile soils in swampy areas, commonly associating with Carex secta.

== Ecology ==
All Urtica species are pollinated by the wind.

== Works cited ==
Books

- Allan, H.H (1961). Flora of New Zealand. Vol. 1. P D Hasselberg Government Printer Publications. ISBN 9780477010566.
- Friis, I. (1993). "Urticaceae". Flowering Plants · Dicotyledons. Berlin, Heidelberg: Springer Berlin Heidelberg. doi:10.1007/978-3-662-02899-5_76. ISBN 978-3-642-08141-5.

Journals

- Grosse-Veldmann, Bernadette; Nürk, Nicolai M.; Smissen, Rob; Breitwieser, Ilse; Quandt, Dietmar; Weigend, Maximilian (2016). "Pulling the sting out of nettle systematics – A comprehensive phylogeny of the genus Urtica L. (Urticaceae)". Molecular Phylogenetics and Evolution. 102. Elsevier BV: 9–19. doi:10.1016/j.ympev.2016.05.019. ISSN 1055-7903.
- Grosse-Veldmann, Bernadette; Conn, Barry J; Weigend, Maximilian (2016). "Weeding the nettles IV: A redefinition of Urtica incisa and allies in New Zealand and Australia, including the segregation of two new species Urtica sykesii and U. perconfusa". Phytotaxa. 245 (4): 251. doi:10.11646/phytotaxa.245.4.2. ISSN 1179-3163.
- Grosse‐Veldmann, Bernadette; Weigend, Maximilian (2018). "The geometry of gender: hyper‐diversification of sexual systems in Urtica L. (Urticaceae)". Cladistics. 34 (2): 131–150. doi:10.1111/cla.12193. ISSN 0748-3007.

Websites

- De Lange, Peter (2026). "Urtica perconfusa". New Zealand Plant Conservation Network. Archived from the original on 7 December 2025.
- "Urtica L." Plants of the World Online. Archived from the original on 12 November 2025 – via Royal Botanic Gardens, Kew.
- "Urtica perconfusa Grosse-Veldm. & Weigend, Phytotaxa 245(4): 257 (2016)". The Royal Botanic Gardens, Kew, Harvard University Herbaria & Libraries and Australian National Herbarium. International Plant Names Index. 2026. Archived from the original on 5 May 2025.
