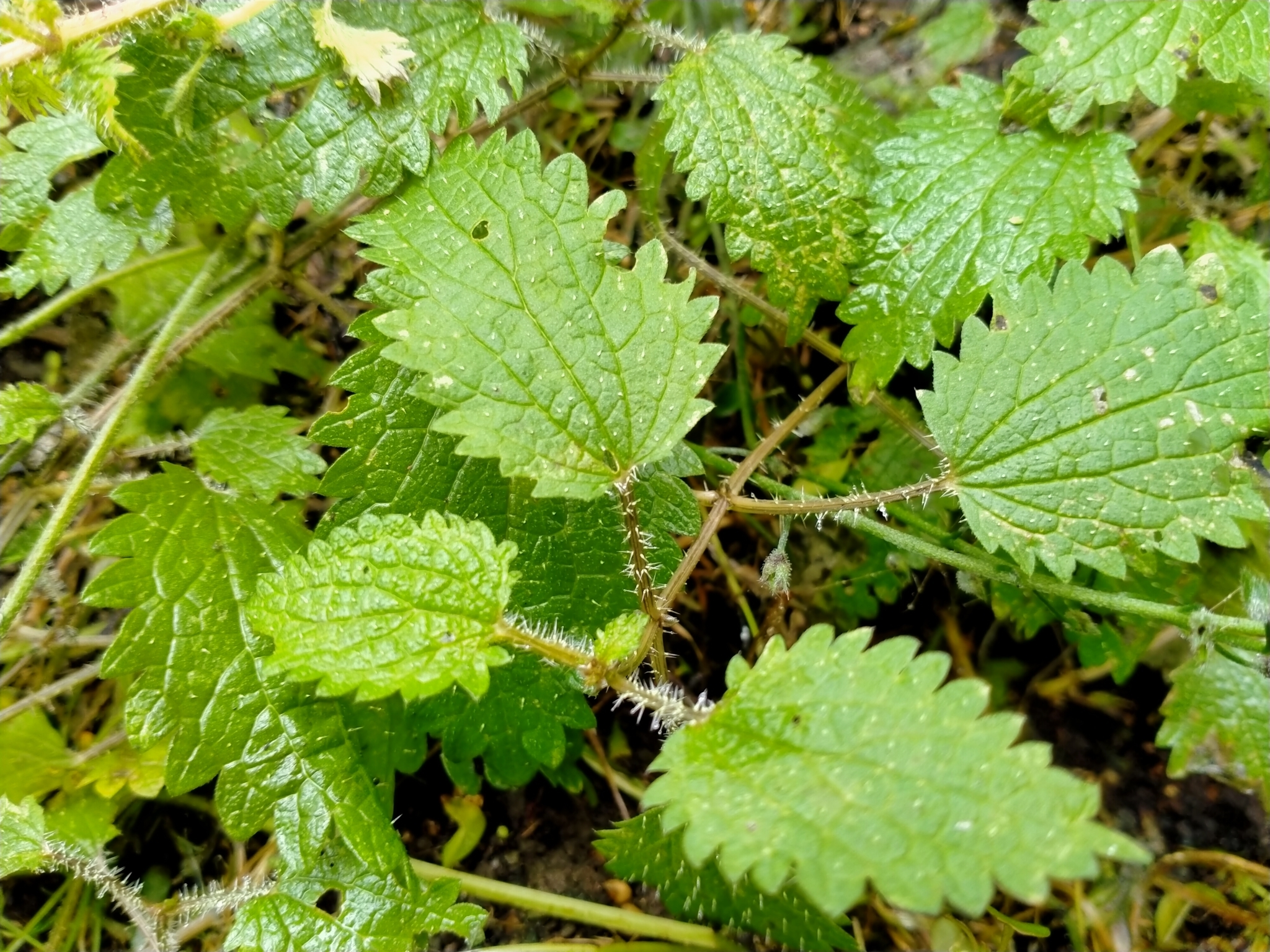
- U. aspera's leaves and spines

Conservation status
- Declining (NZ TCS)

Scientific classification
- Kingdom: Plantae
- Clade: Tracheophytes
- Clade: Angiosperms
- Clade: Eudicots
- Clade: Rosids
- Order: Rosales
- Family: Urticaceae
- Genus: Urtica
- Species: U. aspera

Binomial name
- Urtica aspera Petrie

= Urtica aspera =

Species of flowering plant

Urtica aspera, commonly known as mountain nettle, is a species of nettle endemic to New Zealand's South Island. A member of the Urticaceae, this species is found in montane to subalpine environments from the Marlborough Region to Central Otago. U. aspera grows in an ercet, suberect or trailing manner. It was first described by the botanist Donald Petrie in 1919. It gets its specific epithet, aspera, from the Latin asper, meaning 'rough'.

== Description ==
Urtica aspera (mountain nettle) is a stout dioecious species of herb in the family Urticaceae. The plant can be somewhat woody at the base. It is stout, erect, to trailing in character. U. aspera can grow up to 400 × 600 mm long. All parts of the plant are usually densely covered with short-stalked, fine stinging hairs or trichomes, which gives it a fuzzy appearance. There are four stipules at each node, which are up to 10 mm long. The petioles are usually 10–40 mm long.

Leaves are usually 20–40 mm long and 10–40 mm wide. They are grey-green to green or yellow-green in colour. The base can be slightly heart-shaped. The margins are serrated, with sharp teeth up to 5 mm long. The inflorescences (flower clusters) are up to 50 mm long. The achene are 1–1.5 mm long, and pale brown.

== Taxonomy ==
Urtica aspera was first described by the Scottish botanist Donald Petrie in 1919. There are sixty-nine species of the Urtica genus currently accepted by the Plants of the World Online taxonomic database. These species are found throughout the entire world. There are six species native to New Zealand. U. aspera is closely related to other New Zealand members of the genus Urtica except U. ferox. Grosse‐Veldmann et al. (2016) constructed a phylogenetic tree of the genus Urtica based on gender characteristics and genetic sequencing.

=== Etymology ===
The etymology (word origin) of U. aspera's genus name, Urtica, is derived from the Latin word for stinging nettles, which comes from urere, meaning to burn. The specific epithet (second part of the scientific name), aspera, comes from the Latin asper, meaning 'rough'. A source from 1920 notes that the species' vernacular name is 'mountain nettle'.

== Distribution ==
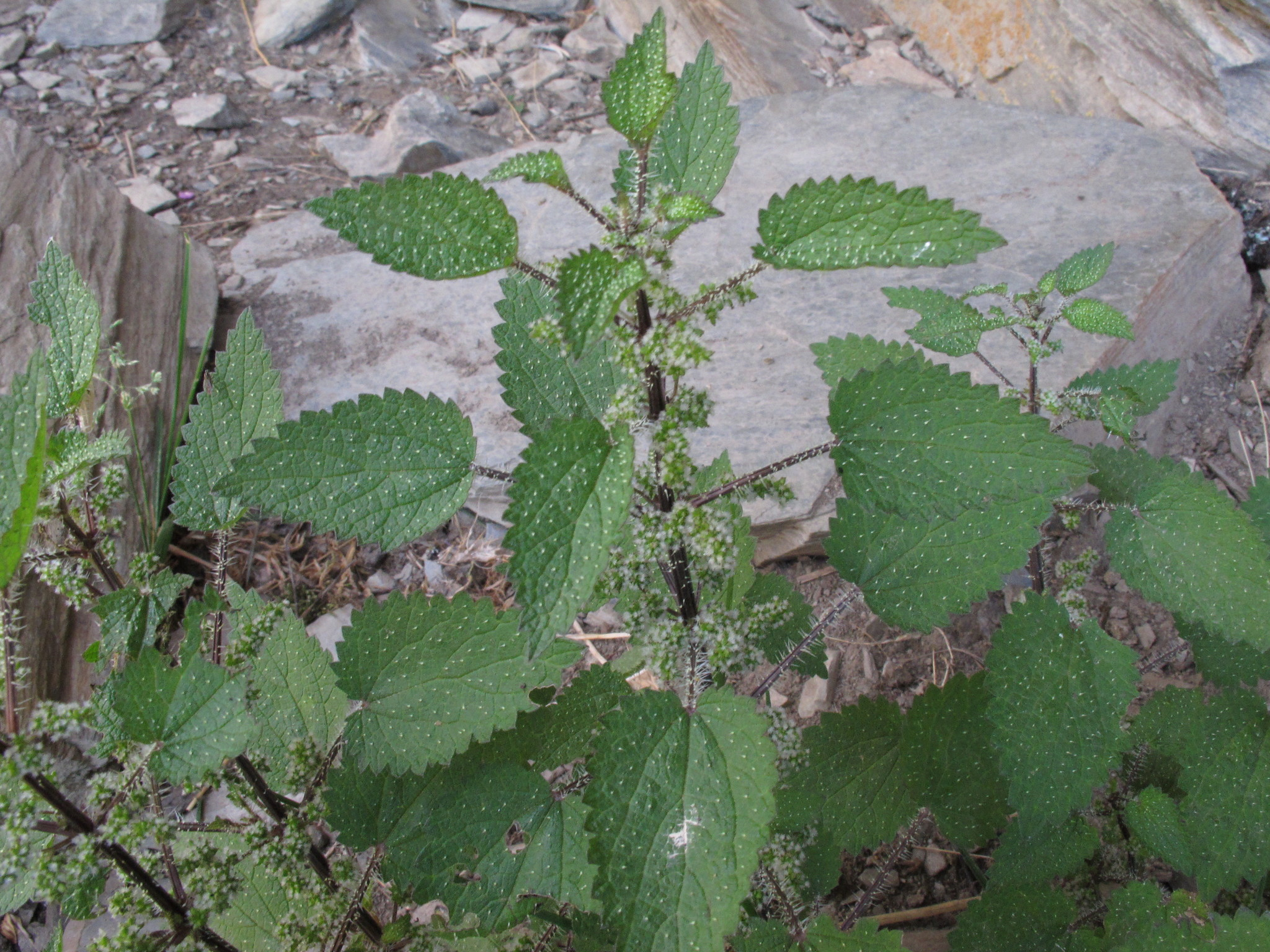
Urtica aspera growing in a rocky environment in Central Otago

Urtica aspera is endemic to New Zealand's South Island. It is found from the Marlborough Region to Central Otago. In the Marlborough Region, it occurs near the Awatere River and the Waiau Toa / Clarence River. The type locality of the species is in the Dunstan Ranges, near Cromwell. The 2023 assessment of U. aspera in the New Zealand Threat Classification System was "At Risk – Declining".

=== Habitat ===
Urtica aspera is typically found in montane to subalpine environments, 300 m (980 ft) above sea level. It inhabits tussock grasslands and grey scrublands. it is commonly found around boulders and tors, at the base of cliffs, on ledges, or beneath shallow rock overhangs. It can also occur at lower elevations in pastures or along river flats. U. aspera prefers dry sites rather than wet ones, and it is highly shade-tolerant.

== Ecology ==
All Urtica species are pollinated by the wind. The larvae of the New Zealand red admiral (Vanessa gonerilla) can be present on U. aspera. A type of rust fungus, called Puccinia caricis, can also be found on U. aspera.

== Works cited ==
Books

- Allan, H.H (1961). Flora of New Zealand. Vol. 1. P D Hasselberg Government Printer Publications. ISBN 9780477010566.
- Friis, I. (1993). "Urticaceae". Flowering Plants · Dicotyledons. Berlin, Heidelberg: Springer Berlin Heidelberg. doi:10.1007/978-3-662-02899-5_76. ISBN 978-3-642-08141-5.
- Pennycook, S. R. (1989). Plant Diseases Recorded in New Zealand. Vol. 2. ISBN 0-477-02547-1.

Journals

- Barron, Mandy C.; Wratten, Stephen D.; Barlow, Nigel D. (2004). "Phenology and parasitism of the red admiral butterfly Vassaris gonerilla (Lepidoptera: Nymphalidae)". New Zealand Journal of Ecology. 28 (1). New Zealand Ecological Society: 105–111. ISSN 0110-6465. JSTOR 24058217.
- Cockayne, L. (1920). "An Economic Investigation of the Montane Tussock-Grassland of New Zealand". New Zealand Journal of Agriculture. 21 (4).
- Grosse-Veldmann, Bernadette; Nürk, Nicolai M.; Smissen, Rob; Breitwieser, Ilse; Quandt, Dietmar; Weigend, Maximilian (2016). "Pulling the sting out of nettle systematics – A comprehensive phylogeny of the genus Urtica L. (Urticaceae)". Molecular Phylogenetics and Evolution. 102. Elsevier BV: 9–19. doi:10.1016/j.ympev.2016.05.019. ISSN 1055-7903.
- Grosse-Veldmann, Bernadette; Conn, Barry J; Weigend, Maximilian (2016). "Weeding the nettles IV: A redefinition of Urtica incisa and allies in New Zealand and Australia, including the segregation of two new species Urtica sykesii and U. perconfusa". Phytotaxa. 245 (4): 251. doi:10.11646/phytotaxa.245.4.2. ISSN 1179-3163.
- Grosse‐Veldmann, Bernadette; Weigend, Maximilian (2018). "The geometry of gender: hyper‐diversification of sexual systems in Urtica L. (Urticaceae)". Cladistics. 34 (2): 131–150. doi:10.1111/cla.12193. ISSN 0748-3007.
- Petrie, D. (1919). "Descriptions of New Native Flowering-plants". Transactions and Proceedings of the Royal Society of New Zealand. 51.

Websites

- De Lange, Peter (2026). "Urtica aspera". New Zealand Plant Conservation Network. Archived from the original on 8 December 2025.
- Pitt, Fiona D. H. (1993). "Petrie, Donald". Te Ara: The Encyclopedia of New Zealand. Archived from the original on 22 January 2025.
- "Urtica L." Plants of the World Online. Archived from the original on 12 November 2025 – via Royal Botanic Gardens, Kew.
- "Urtica aspera Petrie, Trans. & Proc. New Zealand Inst. 1918, li. 107 (1919)". The Royal Botanic Gardens, Kew, Harvard University Herbaria & Libraries and Australian National Herbarium. International Plant Names Index. 2026. Archived from the original on 26 October 2021.
