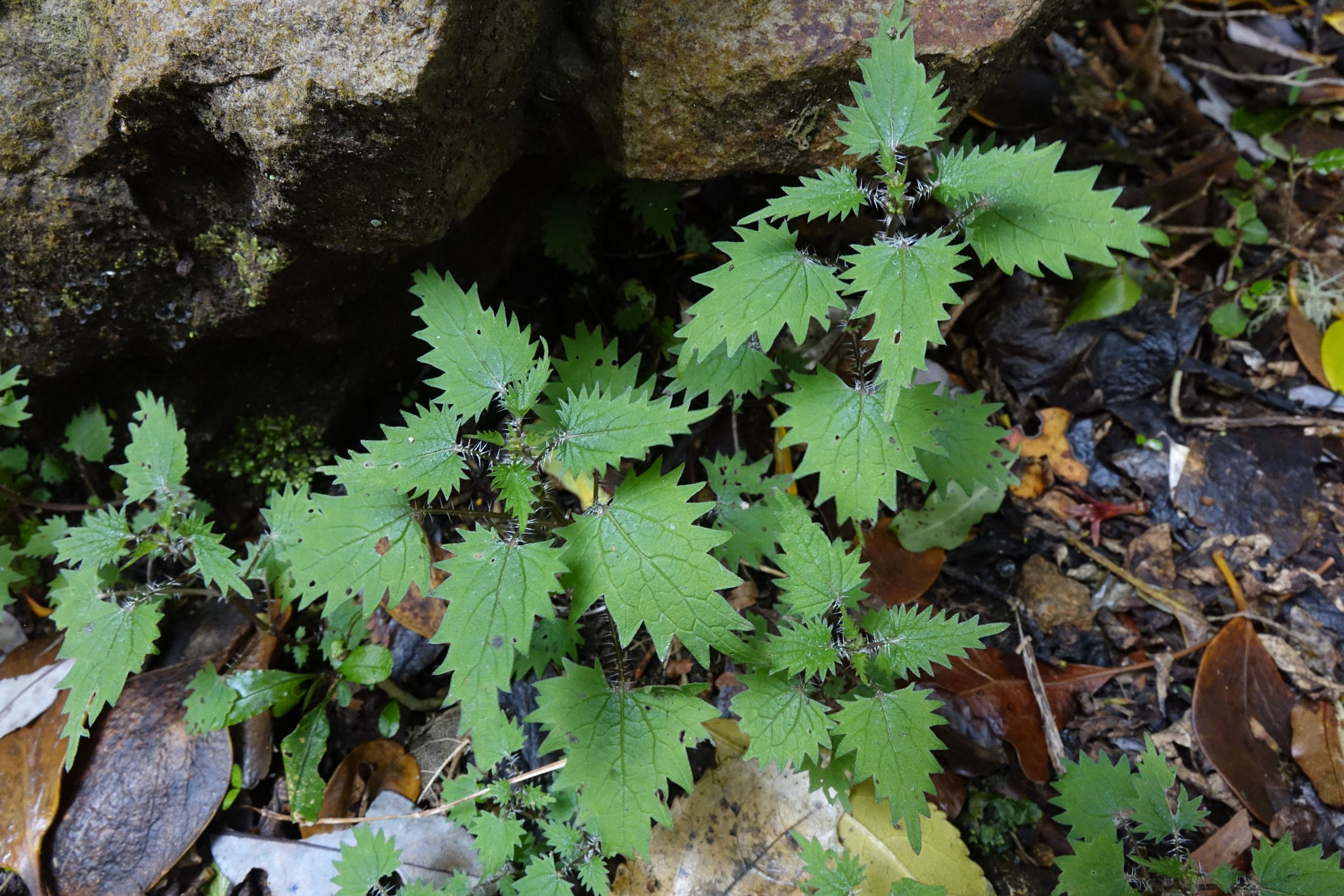
- U. sykesii's habitat

Conservation status
- Not Threatened (NZ TCS)

Scientific classification
- Kingdom: Plantae
- Clade: Tracheophytes
- Clade: Angiosperms
- Clade: Eudicots
- Clade: Rosids
- Order: Rosales
- Family: Urticaceae
- Genus: Urtica
- Species: U. sykesii

Binomial name
- Urtica sykesii Grosse-Veldm. & Weigend

= Urtica sykesii =

Species of flowering plant

Urtica sykesii, commonly known as native nettle and bush nettle, is a species of nettle native to Australia and New Zealand. A member of the Urticaceae, this species is typically found growing on moist soils between rocks. In Australia, the species is restricted to Victoria. In New Zealand, it is found in the North and South Islands. It grows in an erect manner. It was first described in a 2016 study as Urtica sykesii. Its specific epithet, sykesii, is named in honour of a New Zealand botanist.

== Description ==
Urtica sykesii is a monoecious species of perennial herb reaching 0.15–0.60 metres (5.9 inches – 1 foot 11.6 inches) in height. It grows in an erect manner. The stinging hairs or trichomes on the stems are 0.2–0.3 mm long. The petioles are 30–70 mm. Leaves are 20–60 × 20–50 mm long. The margins are regularly dentated. Flowering occurs year-round, the inflorescences (flower clusters) the plant produces are 10–20 mm long. The fruits are rounded and 1.3–1.5 mm long.

== Taxonomy ==
Urtica sykesii was first described in a 2016 study published in Phytotaxa. U. sykesii was previously confused with U. incisa. There are sixty-nine species of the Urtica genus currently accepted by the Plants of the World Online taxonomic database. These species are found throughout the entire world. U. sykesii is closely related to other New Zealand members of the genus Urtica except U. ferox. Grosse‐Veldmann et al. (2016) constructed a phylogenetic tree of the genus Urtica based on gender characteristics and genetic sequencing.

=== Etymology ===
The etymology (word origin) of U. sykesii's genus name, Urtica, is derived from the Latin word for stinging nettles, which comes from urere, meaning to burn. The specific epithet (second part of the scientific name), sykesii, is named in honour of the New Zealand botanist William Russell Sykes. The species is commonly known as 'native nettle' and 'bush nettle.

== Distribution ==
Urtica sykesii is native to Australia and New Zealand. In Australia, the species is restricted to Victoria. In New Zealand, it is found in the North and South Islands. The 2023 assessment of U. sykesii in the New Zealand Threat Classification System was "Not Threatened".

=== Habitat ===
Urtica sykesii is typically found growing on moist soils between rocks between 0–560 metres (0–1,837 feet) above sea level.

== Ecology ==
All Urtica species are pollinated by the wind.

== Works cited ==
Books

- Allan, H.H (1961). Flora of New Zealand. Vol. 1. P D Hasselberg Government Printer Publications. ISBN 9780477010566.
- Friis, I. (1993). "Urticaceae". Flowering Plants · Dicotyledons. Berlin, Heidelberg: Springer Berlin Heidelberg. doi:10.1007/978-3-662-02899-5_76. ISBN 978-3-642-08141-5.

Journals

- Grosse-Veldmann, Bernadette; Nürk, Nicolai M.; Smissen, Rob; Breitwieser, Ilse; Quandt, Dietmar; Weigend, Maximilian (2016). "Pulling the sting out of nettle systematics – A comprehensive phylogeny of the genus Urtica L. (Urticaceae)". Molecular Phylogenetics and Evolution. 102. Elsevier BV: 9–19. doi:10.1016/j.ympev.2016.05.019. ISSN 1055-7903.
- Grosse-Veldmann, Bernadette; Conn, Barry J; Weigend, Maximilian (2016). "Weeding the nettles IV: A redefinition of Urtica incisa and allies in New Zealand and Australia, including the segregation of two new species Urtica sykesii and U. perconfusa". Phytotaxa. 245 (4): 251. doi:10.11646/phytotaxa.245.4.2. ISSN 1179-3163.
- Grosse‐Veldmann, Bernadette; Weigend, Maximilian (2018). "The geometry of gender: hyper‐diversification of sexual systems in Urtica L. (Urticaceae)". Cladistics. 34 (2): 131–150. doi:10.1111/cla.12193. ISSN 0748-3007.

Websites

- De Lange, Peter (2026). "Urtica sykesii". New Zealand Plant Conservation Network. Archived from the original on 14 May 2025.
- "Urtica L." Plants of the World Online. Archived from the original on 12 November 2025 – via Royal Botanic Gardens, Kew.
- "Urtica sykesii Grosse-Veldm. & Weigend, Phytotaxa 245(4): 255 (2016)". The Royal Botanic Gardens, Kew, Harvard University Herbaria & Libraries and Australian National Herbarium. International Plant Names Index. 2026. Archived from the original on 11 August 2025.
