= Joseph Karl Maly =

Austrian physician and botanist (1797–1866)

Josef Karl Maly
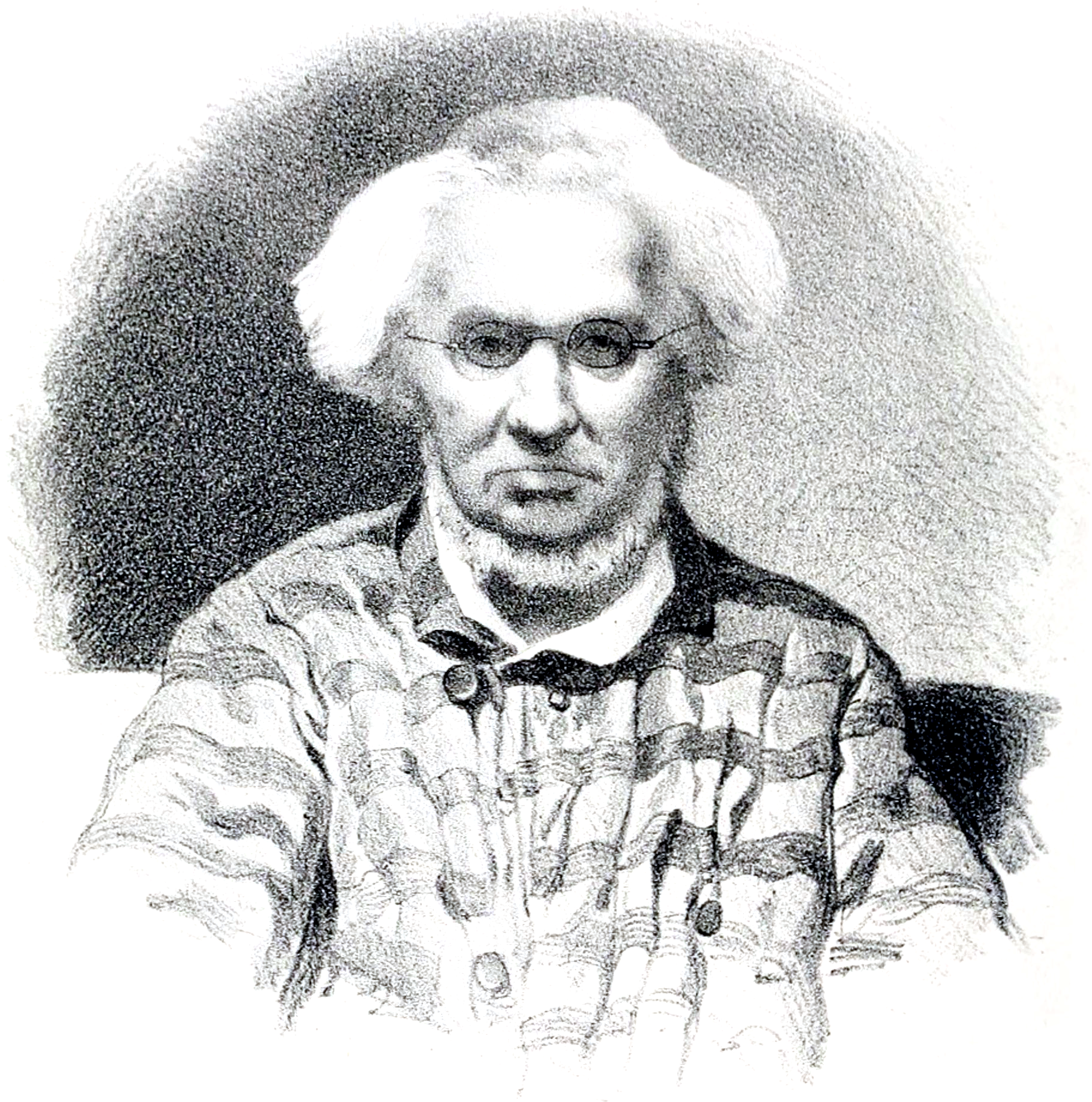
- Born: 3 February 1797; Prague, Kingdom of Bohemia
- Died: 25 January 1866 (aged 68); Graz, Austrian Empire
- Scientific career
- Fields: Botany, Medicine.
- Institutions: Joanneum
- Thesis: De analogis Plantarum affinium Viribus (1823)

Signature
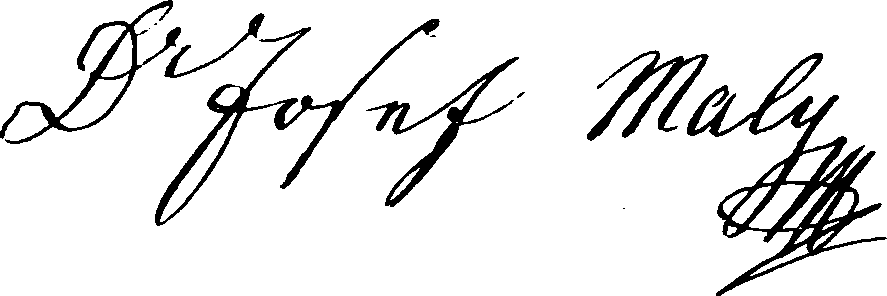

Josef Karl Maly (also Joseph Karl Maly, Joseph Carl Maly) (1797–1866) was a medical doctor and botanist closely associated with the town of Graz, Austria. He published multiple works on Austrian flora, with a particular focus on medicinal and economic botany.

== Life ==
Josef Karl Maly was a botanist closely associated with the town of Graz, Austria. The son of a market gardener in Prague, he attended a gymnasium (school) where he met Franz Sieber, who taught Maly how to dry and preserve plant material for use in a reference herbarium. He went on to study medicine at the University of Prague and graduated as a doctor on 14 December 1823, with the thesis De analogis Plantarum affinium Viribus. During his time in Bohemia, along with Sieber, he also associated with the other major botanists in Prague, including Philipp Maximilian Opiz.

In 1824 he moved to Graz to open a medical practice, but continued to botanise in his spare time. When Lorenz Chrysanth von Vest stepped down as professor of Chemistry and Botany at the Joanneum, he was appointed chair of botany (1830–1832) and held lectures in botany for surgeons. Due to hearing loss, he gave up his medical practice and fell on hard times. By 1850 he had made his last botanical expedition, and from 1858 he used a wheelchair or his bed. He continued to write, hoping to produce an expansive work titled the Flora of Imperial Austria (Flora imperii Austriaci), but it was never completed.

== Major works ==
- Joseph Karl Maly. 1837. Systematische Beschreibung der gebräuchlichsten in Deutschland wildwachsenden oder Kultivierten Arzneigewächse (etc.) (Graz: Verlag von Eduard Ludewig).
- Joseph Carl Maly. 1848. Enumeratio plantarum phanerogamicarum Imperii Austriaci universi. (Vienna: Braumüller & Seidel).
- J.C. Maly. 1848. Anleitung zur Bestimmung der Gattungen der in Deutschland wildwachsenden und allgemein kultivirten Pflanzen, nach der sehr leichten und sicheren analytischen Methode. (Vienna: William Braumüller).
- Josef Karl Maly. 1860. Flora von Deutschland: nach der analytischen Methode. (Vienna: William Braumüller).
- Josef Karl Maly. 1862. Botanik für Damen. Enthaltend die Anfangsgrüde und Systemkunde. (Vienna: Carl Gerold's Sohn).
- Josef Karl Maly. 1863. Systematische Beschreibung der in Österreich wildwachsenden und kultivirten Medicinal-Pflanzen. Für Ärzte und Apotheker. (Vienna: William Braumüller).
- Josef Karl Maly. 1864. Oekonomisch-technische Pflanzenkunde(Vienna: William Braumüller).
- Josef Karl Maly. 1868. Flora von Steiermark. (Vienna: William Braumüller).

== Legacy ==
It has been assumed that he is the namesake of the genus Malya F.M.Opiz, due to the known association between Maly and Opiz. Plant specimens that Maly collected are now held by herbaria worldwide. His type specimens and personal herbarium are at the Universalmuseum Joanneum, with duplicate material at Lund University herbarium, the Royal Botanic Garden Edinburgh, University of Naples Federico II herbarium, National Museum (Prague), Naturalis Biodiversity Center and the National Herbarium of Victoria Royal Botanic Gardens Victoria.

== Standard author abbreviation ==
The standard author abbreviation Maly is used to indicate this person as the author when citing a botanical name.
