= Cystolith =

Mineral formation within a leaf

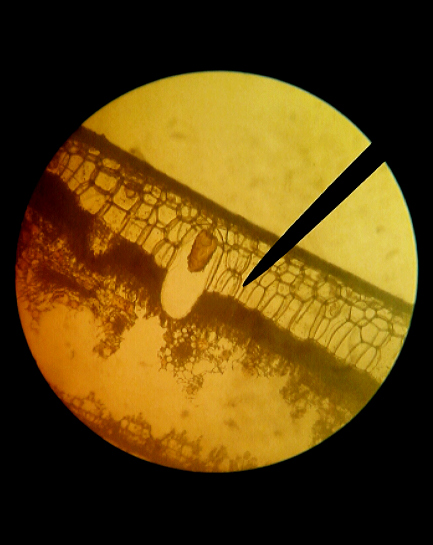
Cystolith from leaf of Ficus elastica

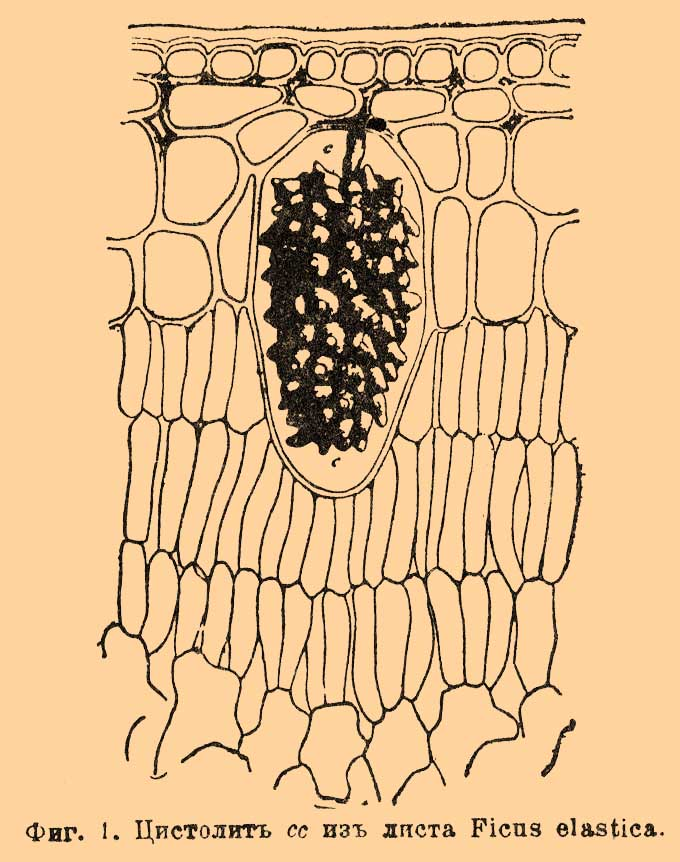
Drawing of a cystolith from leaf of Ficus elastica

Cystolith (Gr. "cavity" and "stone") is a botanical term for outgrowths of the epidermal cell wall, usually of calcium carbonate but sometimes of silicon dioxide also, formed in a cellulose matrix in special cells called lithocysts, generally in the leaf of plants.

Cystoliths are present in certain families, including in many genera of Acanthaceae. Plants in the family Urticaceae, known as stinging nettles, also form leaf cystoliths, but only during their later flowering and seed setting stages. Other examples include Cannabis and other plants in the family Cannabaceae, which produce leaf and flower cystoliths, and Ficus elastica, the Indian rubber plant of the family Moraceae.

From a 1987 article on cystolith development and structure:

... The cystolith is a spindle-shaped body composed of concentric layers of longitudinally oriented cellulose microfibrils associated with pectins and other cell wall polysaccharides. At maturity it is heavily impregnated with calcium carbonate. Some cystoliths also contain silicon and are covered in a sheath of siliceous material. Cystolith formation occurs at the tip of a peg that grows in from the lithocyst wall. Evidence from ultrastructure suggests that the lithocyst cytoplasm transports carbohydrates to the cystolith via Golgi vesicles, and organizes the deposition of cystolith cellulose microfibrils via a system of microtubules lying beneath the plasma membrane that envelopes the growing cystolith. The peg is composed of heavily staining amorphous material like that of an apoplastically sealed cell wall. It is incapable of supporting the migration of lanthanum ions into the cystolith.
