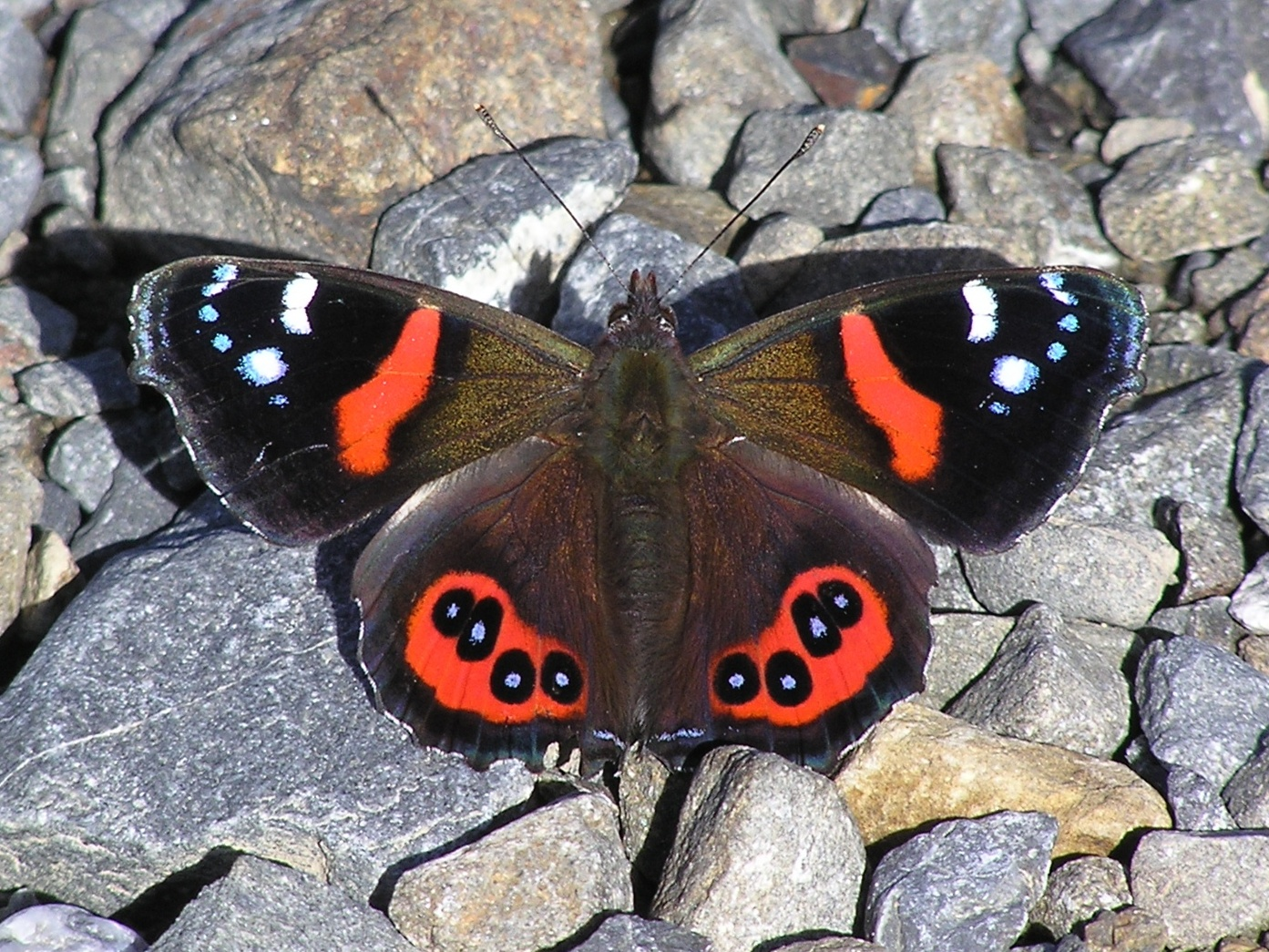
- Upper view of the mainland subspecies
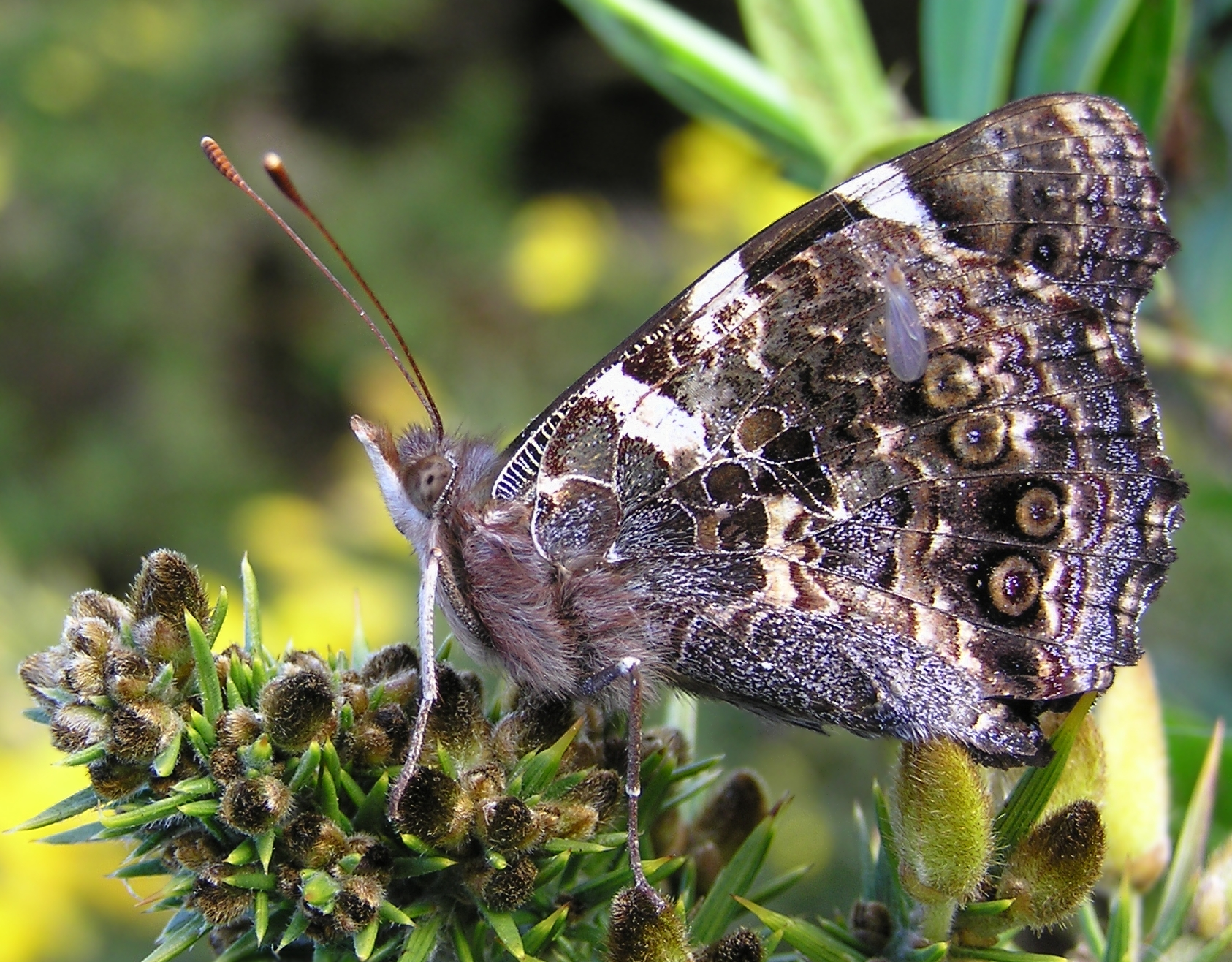
- Wings underside of the mainland subspecies

Conservation status
- Not Threatened (NZ TCS)

Scientific classification
- Kingdom: Animalia
- Phylum: Arthropoda
- Clade: Pancrustacea
- Class: Insecta
- Order: Lepidoptera
- Family: Nymphalidae
- Genus: Vanessa
- Species: V. gonerilla

Binomial name
- Vanessa gonerilla (Fabricius, 1775)

Subspecies
- V. g. gonerilla (Fabricius, 1775); V. g. ida (Alfken, 1899)
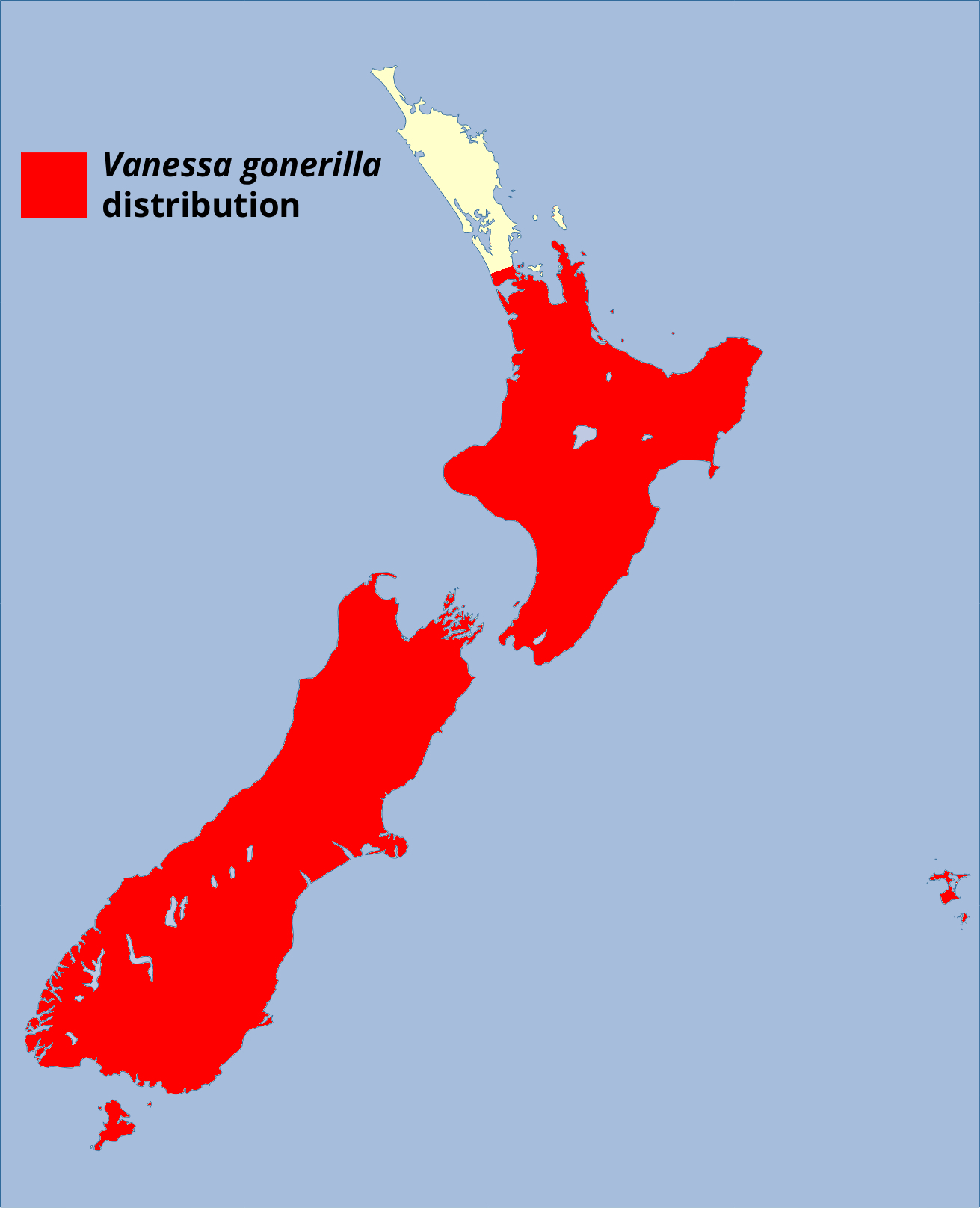
- New Zealand red admiral distribution

Synonyms
- List: Bassaris gonerilla (Fabricius, 1775); Papilio gonerilla Fabricius, 1775; Pyrameis gonerilla (Fabricius, 1775); Pyrameis ida Alfken, 1899

= New Zealand red admiral =

Species of butterfly

The New Zealand red admiral (Vanessa gonerilla) is a species of butterfly native to New Zealand, where it is relatively widespread. In the Māori language, which is spoken by the people indigenous to New Zealand, the butterfly is referred to as kahukura, which means 'red cloak'. There are two subspecies of red admiral, which occur on the mainland and on the Chatham Islands, respectively. As an adult, the red admiral has a wingspan of around 50–60 mm (2.0–2.4 in). The wings are blackish and have distinctive red and white markings. The Chatham Islands subspecies is nearly identical to the mainland subspecies, but has slightly different red markings.

As a caterpillar, the red admiral is blackish with green markings. It is sometimes mistaken for the yellow admiral (Vanessa itea), which is also common in New Zealand. The caterpillar feeds on the leaves of Urtica (stinging nettles), especially Urtica ferox (ongaonga). Egg laying begins in September and proceeds until late May (early spring to late autumn in the Southern Hemisphere). After hatching, it takes five to six weeks for the caterpillar to begin to enter the pupal stage, where the caterpillar forms a cocoon and transitions into an adult. After two to three weeks, the adult emerges from the chrysalis. The red admiral is a strong flier that tends to move in an erratic pattern. The Chatham Islands subspecies is reported to be more timid and flighty than the mainland subspecies.

The red admiral was first scientifically described in 1775 by Danish zoologist Johan Christian Fabricius from specimens collected during the first voyage of James Cook. It has been proposed that the red admiral is in decline, but this is difficult to assess due to an absence of historical population records. Under the New Zealand Threat Classification System, it is listed as "Not Threatened". The red admiral is heavily parasitised by the exotic (non-native) wasps Echthromorpha intricatoria (cream-spotted ichneumon) and Pteromalus puparum, which lay eggs in the red admiral pupa. In one survey, P. puparum and E. intricatoria were present in many pupae. It has been suggested that the perceived decline of the red admiral is due to the high level of parasitism by E. intricatoria.

== Taxonomy ==
The red admiral was first described in 1775 by Danish zoologist Johan Christian Fabricius as Papilio gonerilla in his taxonomic work Systema entomologiae. The specimens used by Fabricius were collected during the first voyage of James Cook, which was the second time Europeans visited New Zealand, making the red admiral among the earliest species to be formally described in taxonomic literature. The type specimens (the specimens on which the species description is based) are stored in the Banks collection in the Natural History Museum of London. After the species was first described, several authors placed it in the genera Vanessa or Pyrameis; the species ended up in the genus Bassaris in 1971 (which was split from Vanessa). After genetic studies in 2005, Bassaris was accepted to be the same as Vanessa and thus the species was moved to this genus. There is a single record of the red admiral creating a hybrid with the yellow admiral (Vanessa itea), a closely related species that is also widespread in New Zealand.

In 1899 German entomologist Johann Dietrich Alfken described the species Pyrameis ida from specimens collected on Chatham Island. The species was named after the collector, Ida Schauinsland, who was visiting the island with her zoologist husband Hugo Schauinsland. The specimens described were thought to be lost, but were eventually rediscovered in 2000. In 1912, the species was designated as a subspecies of the New Zealand red admiral with the mainland population being a separate subspecies.

=== Naming and etymology ===
The mainland subspecies is commonly referred to as the red admiral or New Zealand red admiral, whereas the Chatham Islands subspecies is referred to as the Chatham Island red admiral. Vanessa gonerilla is also referred to as kahukura in the indigenous Māori language. The word kahukura is derived from kakahu and hura, which mean "garment" and "red", respectively. The genus name Vanessa is likely derived from the character of the same name in the poem "Cadenus and Vanessa" by Jonathan Swift.

== Description ==
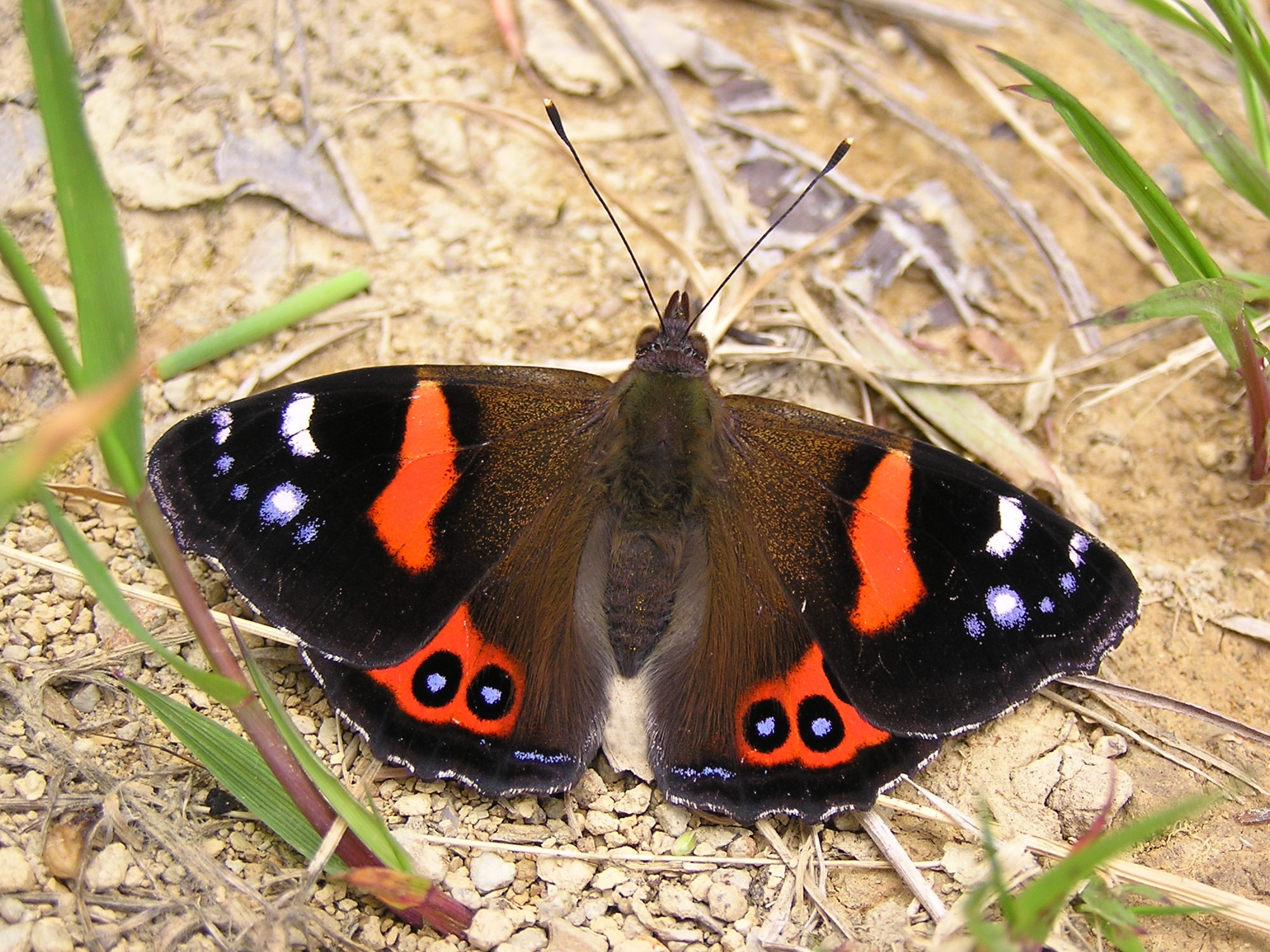
Mainland subspecies (V. g. gonerilla)

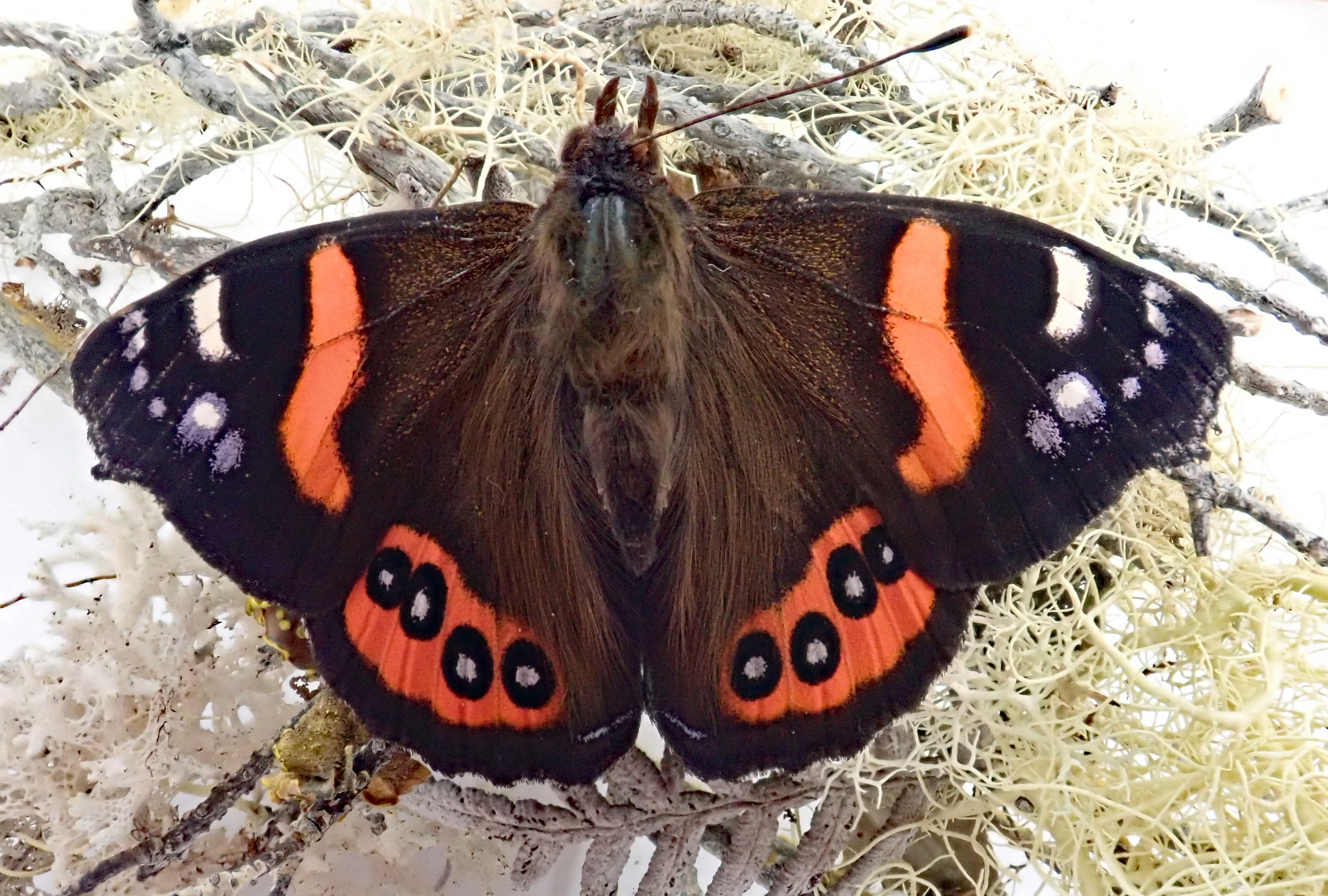
Chatham Islands subspecies (V. g. ida)

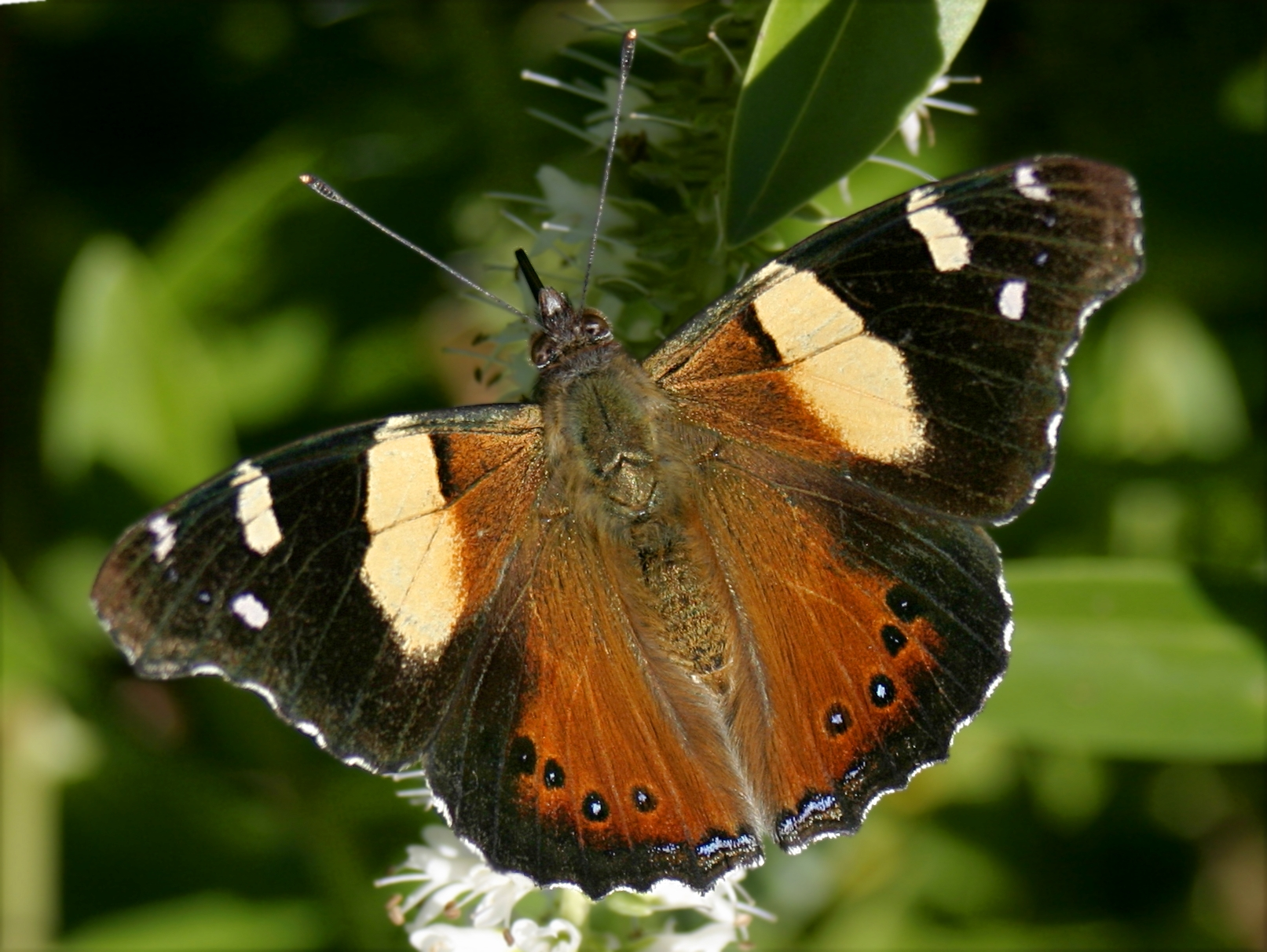
The yellow admiral (Vanessa itea), which is similar to the red admiral

The red admiral has a wingspan of around 50–60 mm (2.0–2.4 in). The top side of the forewings are mostly black, with a central bright red bar running back from the front edge. There are blue spots and white spots, fringed with light blue, near the forewing tips. The rear wings have a background colour of dark reddish brown with a red patch containing four black circles, and the centre of each circle has a pale blue dot. The extent of brown colouring varies somewhat, some individuals having a pale brown to near-white background colour at the base of the rear wings and tip of forewings. The underside of the rear wings is a mottled collection of white, brown and black shapes, which camouflages the butterfly when at rest.

The two subspecies of the red admiral are very similar and difficult to distinguish, although the red marking of the hind wing is less extensive in the mainland subspecies than in the Chatham Islands subspecies. The rear margin of the hind wing is also more wavy in the mainland subspecies.

The red admiral is somewhat similar to the yellow admiral (Vanessa itea), which overlaps with it in distribution and is frequently found with it. They are easily distinguished by the red-orange markings of the forewing whereas the yellow admiral forewings are distinctly yellowish.

=== Juvenile stages ===
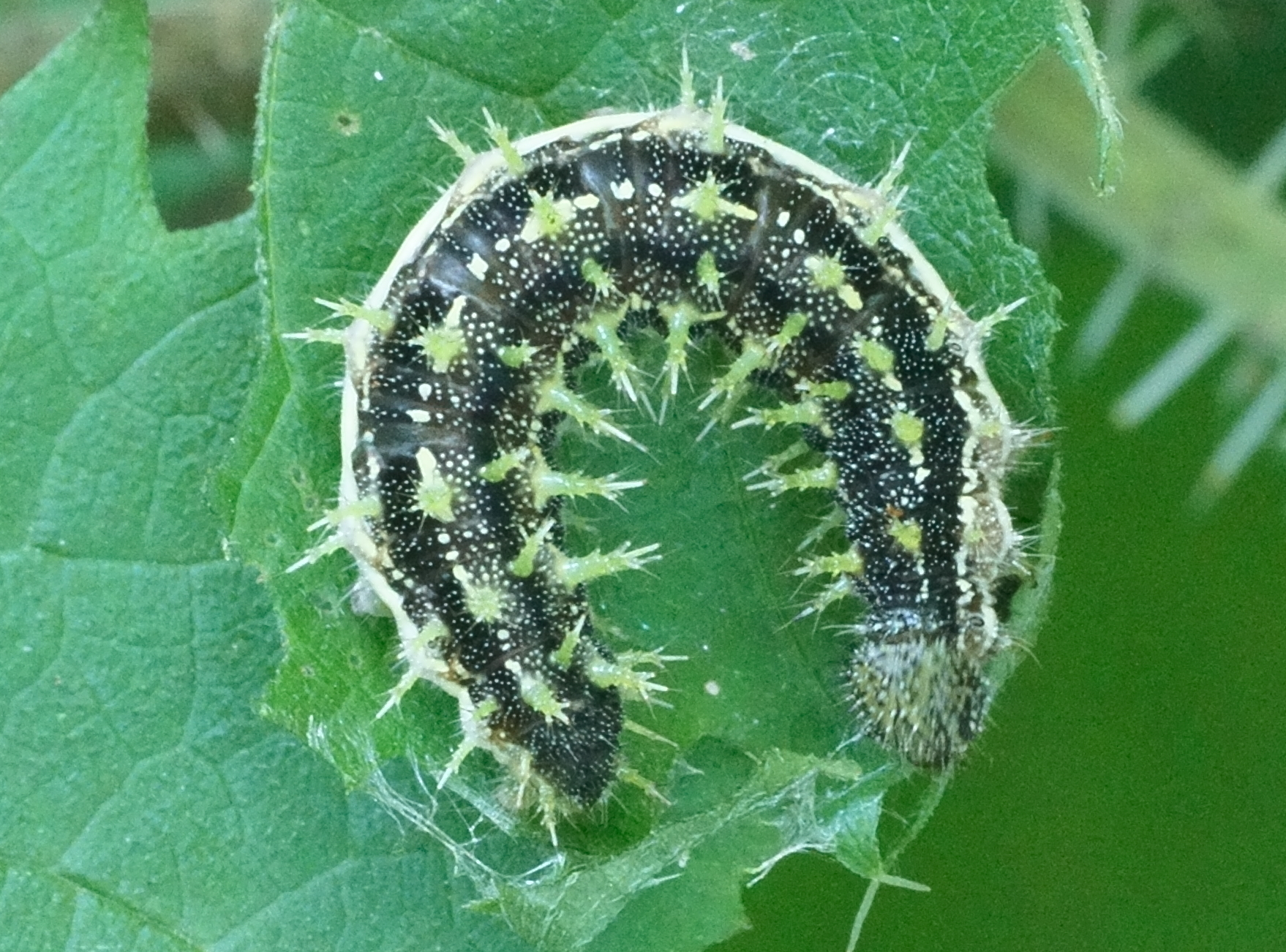
Red admiral caterpillar fifth instar

The barrel-shaped egg is green and has nine ribs that run from top to bottom. Although the adult red admiral is coloured quite differently to the yellow admiral, as caterpillars they are difficult to distinguish. The mature red admiral caterpillar can be distinguished from that of the yellow admiral by the pale pigment markings on abdominal segments four to six, which are somewhat wider in the yellow admiral. The two caterpillars can also be distinguished by the size of setae, hair-like structures, that run along the very top of the abdominal segments and are mounted on thickened stalks. In the red admiral, the uppermost of these setae are shorter than their thickened stalks, whereas in the yellow admiral the same setae are longer than their thickened stalks. The caterpillar of the Chatham Islands subspecies has never been described, but is presumed to be identical to the mainland subspecies.

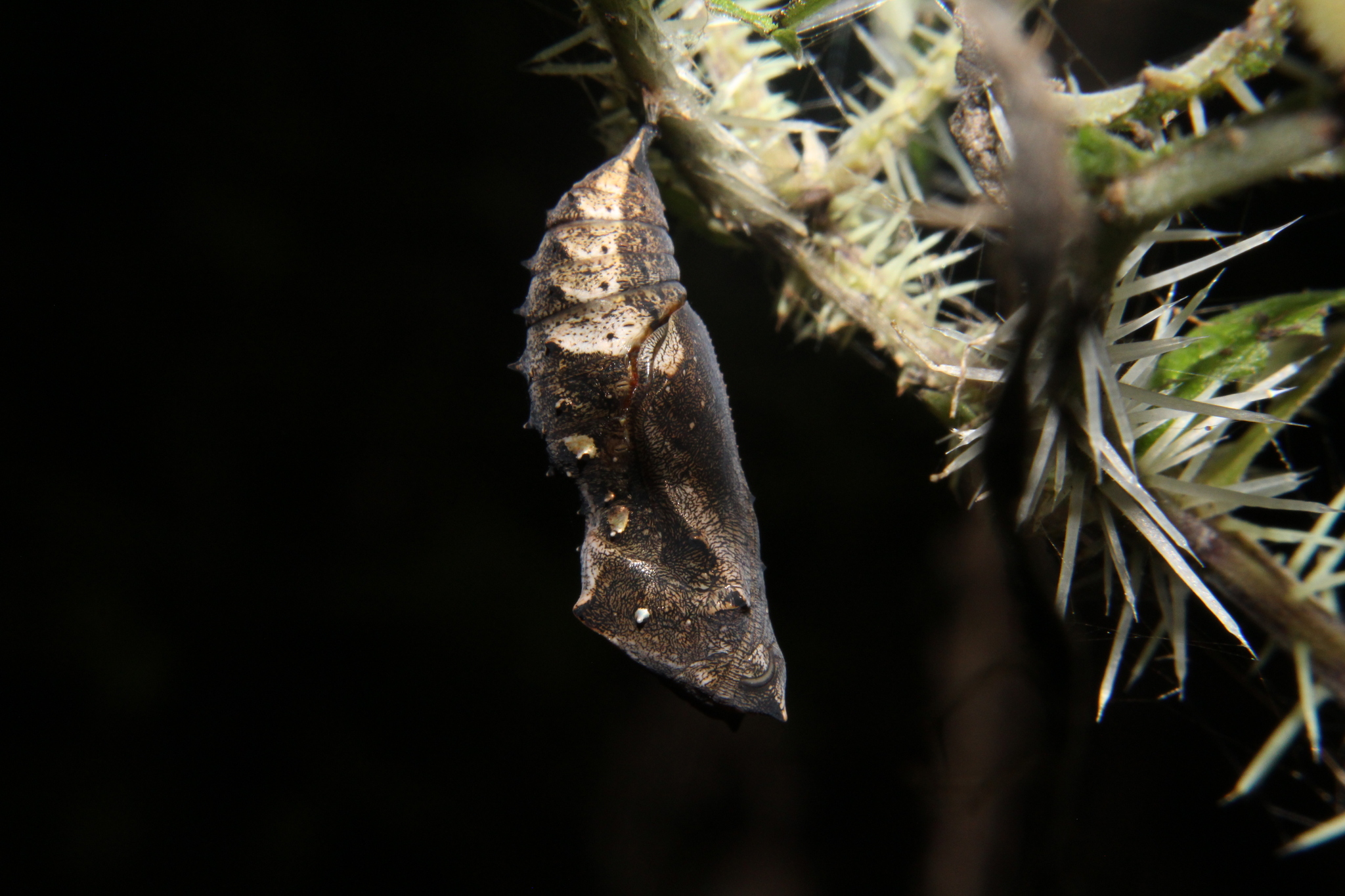
Red admiral pupating

During the first instar (developmental stage), the caterpillar is brown with a black head and small white markings scattered throughout its body. During this stage the setae are unbranched. By the end of the first instar, the caterpillar is around 2.5 mm (0.098 in) in length. The second instar caterpillar is coloured similarly but also has a white stripe above the legs. In this stage the setae are now branched and the caterpillar reaches up to 5 mm (0.20 in) in length. During the third instar, the caterpillar can reach 10 mm (0.39 in) in length, with markings becoming more obvious and the texture of the head being more bumpy. The fourth instar is similar to the third, but with spines of the body now being on raised bumps. In the fifth (final) instar, the caterpillar grows up to 36 mm (1.4 in) in length. Most are black to dark brown on the upper side of the body with light brown and green on the under side. The head is greenish with dark patches. During the pupal stage, when the caterpillar forms a cocoon and is transitioning into an adult, it is generally dull brown, the abdomen being paler than the rest of the body. The surface of the pupa has metallic gold knobs and is highly sculptured. In the last days before completing pupation, the wings are visible through the surface of the pupa.

== Distribution and habitat ==
The red admiral is relatively common throughout most of New Zealand, including on Stewart Island. The Chatham Islands subspecies is widespread on Chatham Island and Pitt Island, the second largest island in the group. The species can be found in a variety of habitats, including suburban gardens, forests and on mountains.

== Diet ==
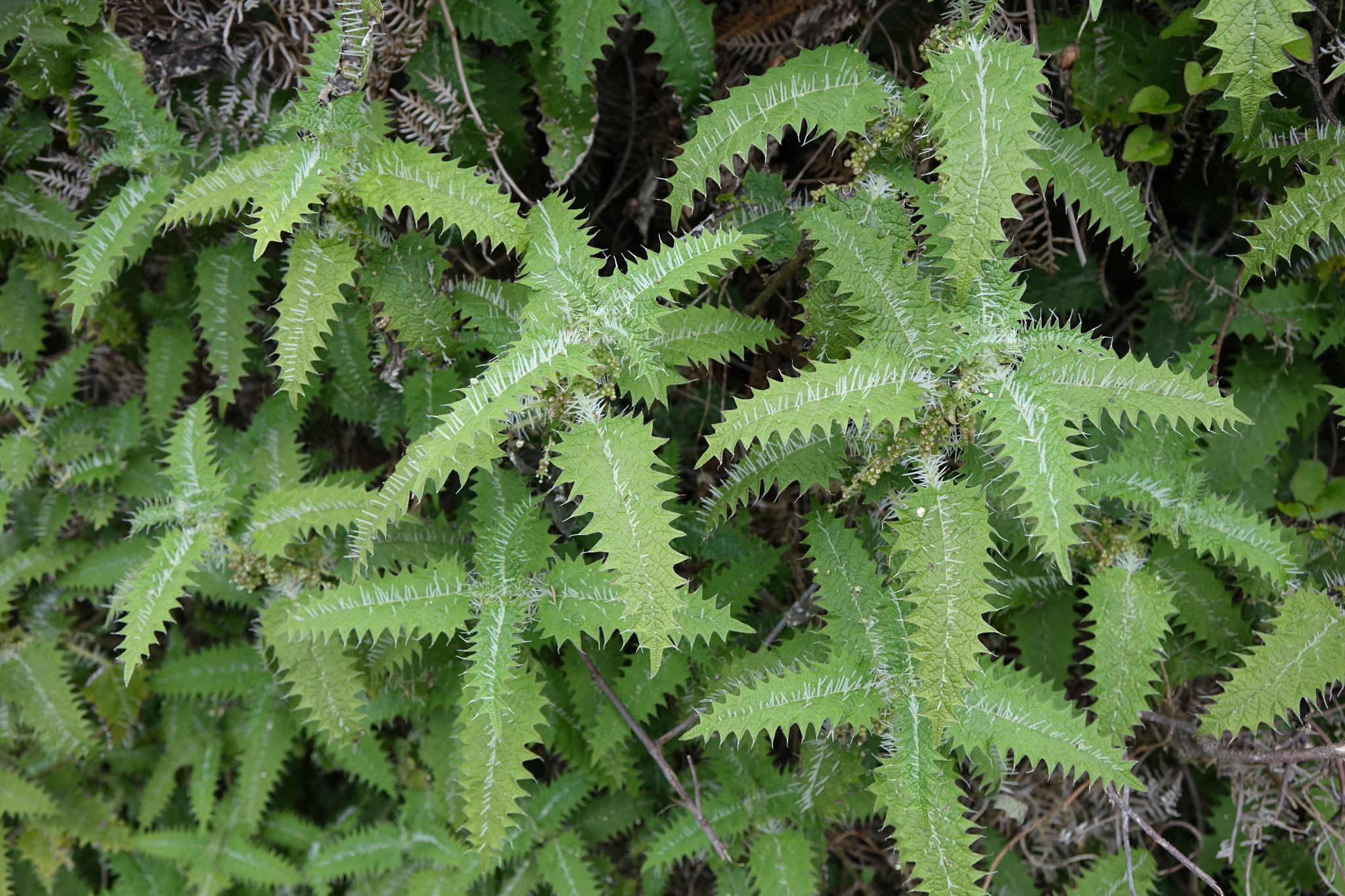
Urtica ferox, the main host plant of the red admiral caterpillar

The primary host plant for red admiral caterpillar is the native stinging nettle, also known as ongaonga (Urtica ferox), although the caterpillar can also eat other Urtica species such as Urtica incisa. In a study where the red admiral was presented with several species of Urtica to lay eggs on, it was found to preferentially lay eggs on Urtica ferox. When the caterpillar was grown on this species, it was generally heavier than when grown on other species, indicating that it was an optimal food source for the caterpillar. This was suggested to be an example of the preference-performance hypothesis, where a species will preferentially lay eggs on plants that are most suitable. The Chatham Islands subspecies is reported to use Urtica australis as a host plant instead. As an adult, the red admiral feeds on flower nectar from several species and on the sap of Nothofagus (southern beech) trees.

== Life cycle ==
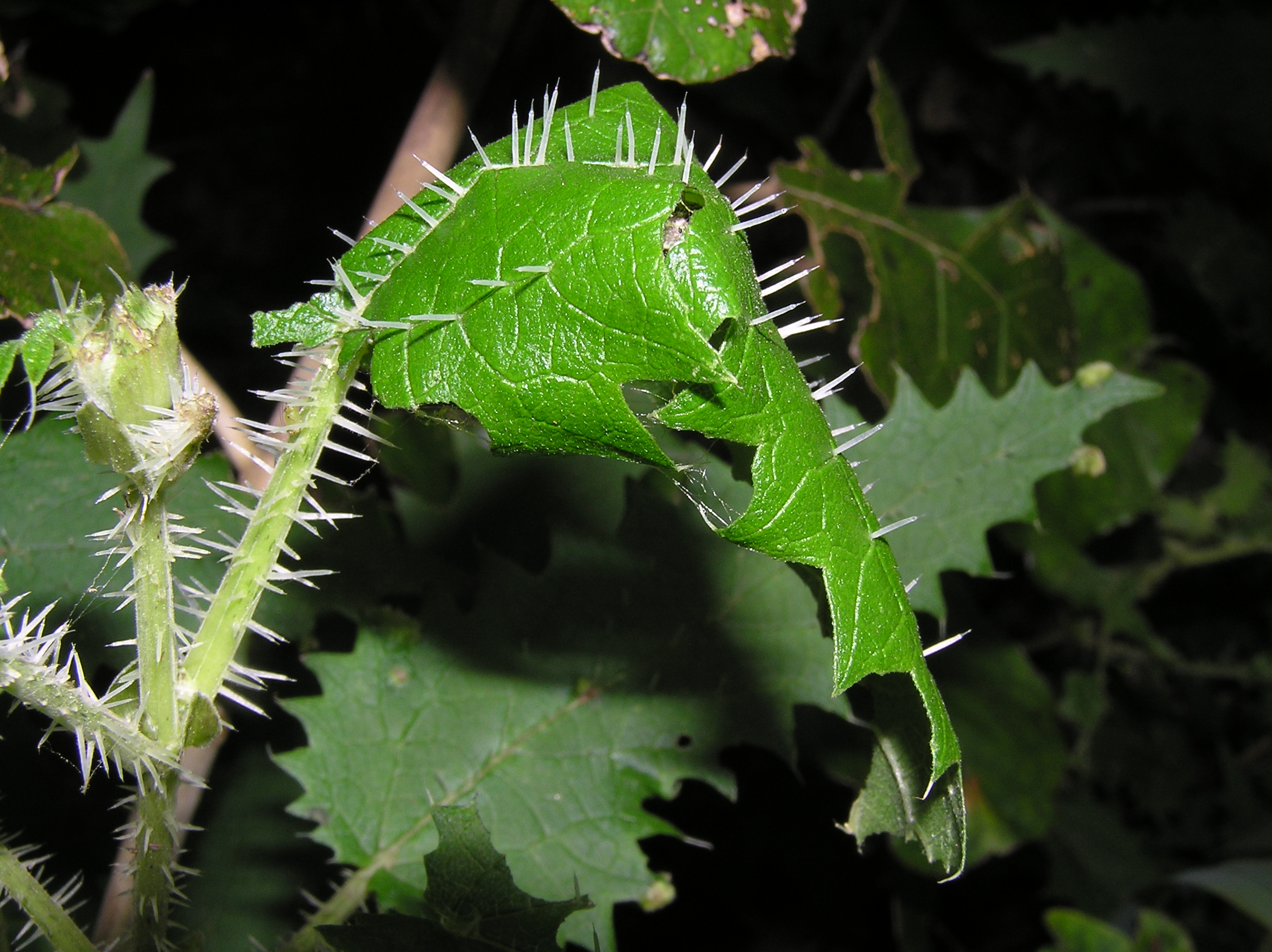
Tent structure produced by the red admiral caterpillar. The structure is held together by silk strands

Egg laying generally commences in September and proceeds until late May (early spring to late autumn in the Southern Hemisphere). The eggs are typically laid at the tip of the leaves, often on the side with the stinging hairs. The eggs have a low mortality rate. In one study in the Canterbury region, the red admiral egg had a mortality rate of around 95%, which was due to parasitism or the non-viability of the egg, among other factors. After the eggs are laid on their host plant, they will hatch into caterpillars after eight to ten days.

To leave the egg, the caterpillar eats a hole in the top of the egg, but does not eat the rest of the egg. In its host plant, the caterpillar creates a tent-like structure out of a live leaf by bending and pulling the tip of the leaf and fastening it with silk strands. In this tent structure, the caterpillar feeds on the leaf, possibly venturing out at night as well. Due to the host plant's stinging hairs, the caterpillar is extremely safe in the tent. It takes five to six weeks for the caterpillar to develop through its five instars. The caterpillar then pupates in the tent, at the stem of the plant or on another solid structure. To do this, it suspends itself from its rear with a strand of silk, then over the course of about a day, it twists its old exoskeleton off, exposing its pupal form. After two to three weeks, the adult red admiral emerges. The adult appears to be most abundant during October. The adult lives for several months, potentially up to a year if it is overwintering.

Based on surveys of egg, caterpillar and adult populations, it appears that the red admiral is multivoltine (producing multiple generations per year) with surveys finding it completes two generations per breeding season, and a third generation may begin (but not be completed) during suitable years. Both during its adult and caterpillar stage, the red admiral during late autumn (the end of their breeding season) tends to be long-lived and will over-winter until the next season. In one multiple year survey, populations were less dense during a low-rainfall season, which may have been because the host plant had lower mortality rates. Unlike many other Vanessa butterflies, the red admiral does not migrate.

== Behaviour ==
The red admiral is a strong flier that usually moves in an erratic pattern. If crossing a water gap, it will remain a couple of metres above the surface and fly straight. When in flight, the wings move near constantly and only briefly enter a gliding position. The Chatham Islands subspecies is reported to be more timid and flighty than the mainland subspecies. The red admiral has also been reported as a vagrant (animal that has drifted outside its normal distribution) on Macquarie Island, which is about 1,130 km (700 mi) south-west of New Zealand. It has been noted that when the red admiral caterpillar is overwintering, it can make a grating noise when disturbed, perhaps to scare away predators. The caterpillar's mandibular gland, which is located near the mouth and secretes saliva-like substances, produces high amounts of chemosensory proteins (proteins that interact with other chemicals to make them detectable). The reason for this is not known for certain, but it has been proposed that the mandibular gland is used to detect chemical stimuli, possibly to enable it to recognise host plants or detect other caterpillars.

== Predators and parasites ==
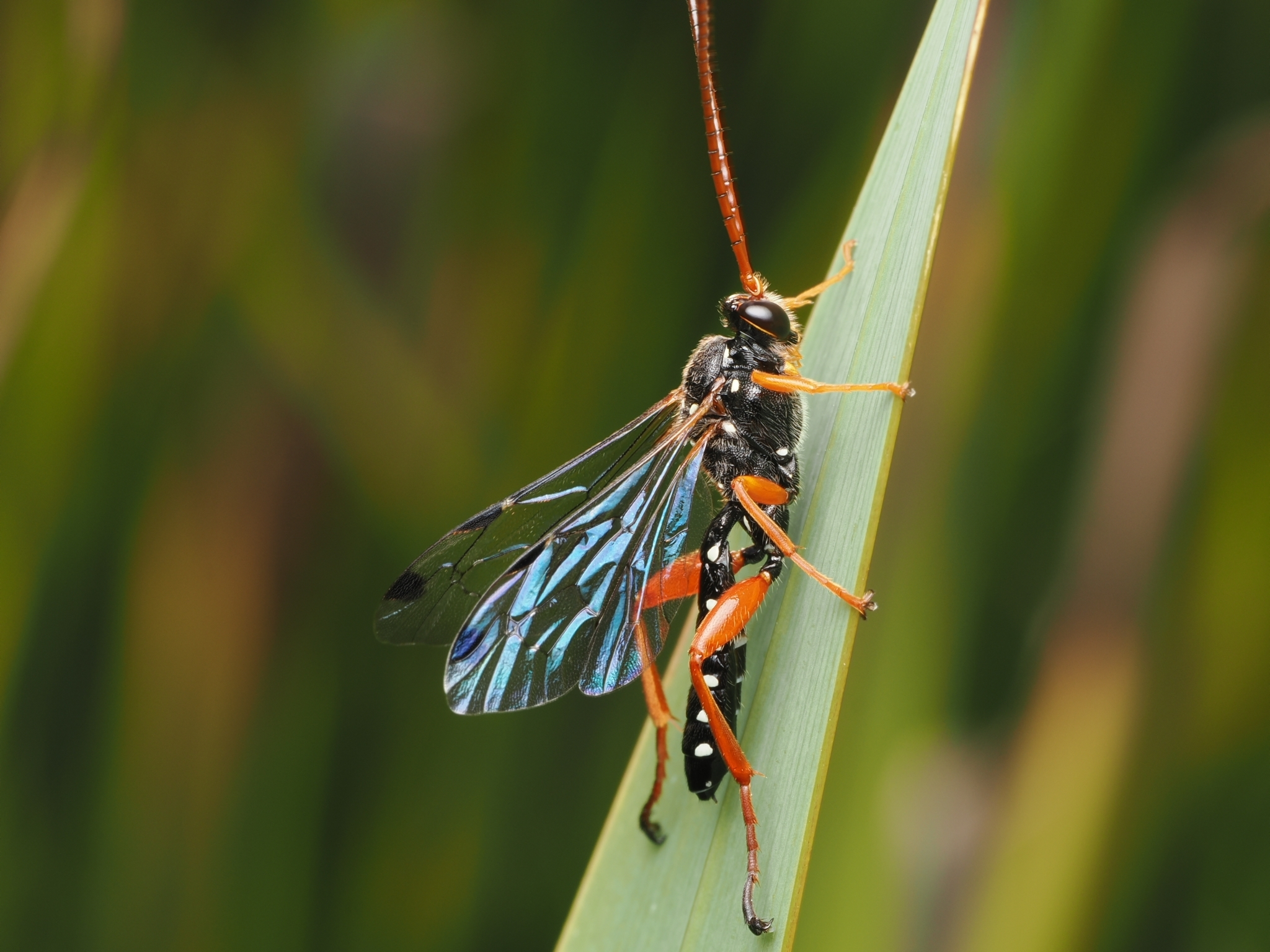
Echthromorpha intricatoria, which parasitises the red admiral caterpillar

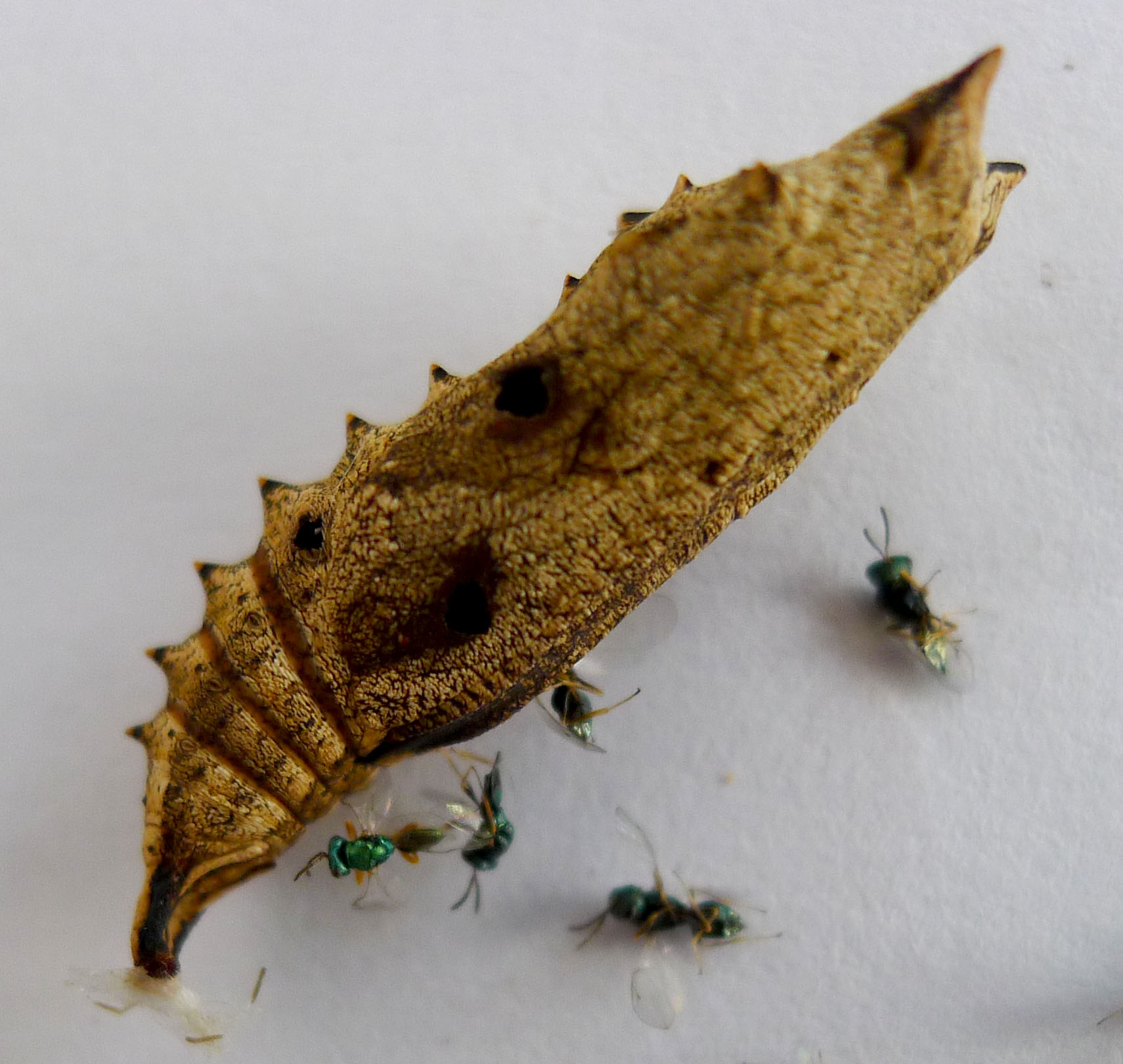
Pteromalus puparum emerging from a Lepidoptera pupa

The ichneumonid wasp Echthromorpha intricatoria (cream-spotted ichneumon) from Australia was first recorded in New Zealand in 1900, apparently being self-introduced. It is a parasitoid (organism that lives in another host and kills it) that lays its eggs in the pupa of the red admiral. In the pupa, the eggs develop into larvae (juveniles), which then emerge from the red admiral pupa and mature into adults, a process which kills the pupa. When the pupa is being parasitised by the wasp, it causes the pupa to become a rust colour. The pteromalid wasp Pteromalus puparum was introduced by government entomologists in 1932–33 to control the cabbage white butterfly (Pieris rapae), a serious agricultural pest that is an introduced species in New Zealand. This wasp is also a parasitoid of the red admiral pupa in the same way E. intricatoria does. P. puparum appears to be unable to survive overwintering in the red admiral pupa, so it requires other hosts to sustain its population.

In a survey at Banks Peninsula, P. puparum was present in 3.5–16.9% of red admiral pupae, depending on the survey site, whereas E. intricatoria was present in 67.5–82.3% of red admiral pupae. In surveys from the Wellington, Canterbury and Dunedin regions, E. intricatoria had a parasitism rate of 67% in the red admiral pupa whereas P. puparum had a rate of 8%, although the surveys may have been overestimates. E. intricatoria also appears to be capable of overwintering in the pupae. Because of the high level of parasitism by E. intricatoria, it was suggested that this may be a major cause of the supposed decline of the red admiral. Statistical modelling of red admiral populations in Banks Peninsula has inferred that P. puparum may be suppressing red admiral populations by roughly 5% whereas E. intricatoria is suppressing it by around 30%.

Cermatulus nasalis (the brown soldier bug), which is native to New Zealand where it is widespread, has been observed preying upon red admiral caterpillars. The eggs of the red admiral are parasitised by the parasitoid wasp Telenomus crinisacri, from the family Scelionidae, which lays its eggs inside the red admiral eggs. In one study, Telenomus caused around 57% of mortality in red admiral eggs. A fly in the genus Pales, from the family Tachinidae, also parasitises the red admiral caterpillar. There is a record of a red admiral caterpillar infected with the nuclear polyhedrosis virus, which in other hosts replicates in the nuclei of cells and produces harmful protein crystals. The shining bronze cuckoo has been observed feeding on red admiral caterpillars.

== Conservation ==
As of 2025 under the New Zealand Threat Classification System, the red admiral mainland subspecies is listed as "Not Threatened" whereas the Chatham Islands subspecies is categorized as "Uncommon" with the qualifier of "Island Endemic". There is anecdotal evidence that the red admiral is in decline, but because there are no historical records of its abundance, it is very difficult to assess accurately. It has been proposed that the presence of exotic parasitic wasps may have led to the species' supposed decline. Another potential reason for the perceived decline is that host plants may have become less common, at least in suburban areas. As such, there are some efforts by conservation groups to plant Urtica ferox in an attempt to bolster red admiral populations.

== See also ==
- Butterflies of New Zealand
