= Chemosensory speciation =

Chemosensory speciation (chemosensory isolation) is the evolution of a population to become distinct species that is driven by chemical stimuli (i.e., chemical signals, recognition). These chemical signals may create premating or other isolating behavioral barriers that prevent gene flow among subpopulations that eventually lead to two separate species.

Chemosensory pathways are vital for exogenous and endogenous recognition and processing of volatile organic compounds (VOCs); therefore, they are viewed as active attributors to an organism's behavior. Chemosensory pathways involving: odorant binding proteins (OBP), chemosensory proteins (CSP), gustatory receptors (GR), and sensory neuron membrane proteins (SNMP), have been investigated in numerous biological systems as genetic barriers. These chemosensory genes are utilized for identification of candidate loci that are under positive selection. Experiments are commonly tailored to studying an organism's response to alterations in their chemosensory pathways, or using molecular phylogenetics to analyze the divergence of these systems in sister taxa. Sensory pathways allow integration of environmental stimuli that strongly influence an organism's behavior and are hypothesized to have broad implications as a module of behavioral selection; nevertheless, here it will be reviewed briefly in three well-supported modules: Resource Identification (foraging behaviors), Conspecific Interactions (sexual selection), and Host Recognition.

== Resource identification ==
In vivo, a complex of chemical signals and pheromones are commonly perceived together instead of as chemical isolates. Identification of specific chemical cues in the myriad of surrounding compounds commonly leads to behavioral changes in the recipient organism. For instance, in a recent publication studying behavioral phenotypes, the researchers identify a foraging behavioral shift that is caused by an insensitivity to one of several pheromone isoforms detected in the mutant and wildtype; the pheromone insensitivity stimulates a constant foraging behavior, despite regular activity performed by the other individuals in the population. The expansion and evolution of chemosensory systems are especially evident in the insect lineage due to their life history. For example, a recent publication highlights the importance of odorant receptors (OR) for proper antennal lobe (AL) function; a gene knockout of an OR co-receptor drastically impaired AL development in the clonal raider ant, Ooceraea biroi. Chemosensory systems, and their regulatory repertoire, influence the development and behavior of foraging organisms.

== Host recognition ==
Regardless of the relationship (symbiont, commensal, or parasitic), host recognition is determined by deciphering the surrounding chemical cocktails for specific signals that excite their sensory receptors. Host race formation in Aphid species has recently been used as a model system to understand divergent selection in the face of gene flow. For populations that depend on a host, their ability to identify and locate host signals are recognized as being under a post-mating selection pressure. The host-dependent organisms harbor sensory adaptations that allow them to appropriately process complex mixtures of chemical cues. Intermating populations that are host specific may have a higher chance of allopatric isolation and divergence due to a narrowed niche and host's ecological variability. Another evolutionary model that supports chemosensory importance is the antagonistic Red Queen hypothesis that elaborates on coevolution adaptations.

== Conspecific interaction ==
Olfactory cues are widely used for conspecific and mate selection but are also commonly used in avoidance strategies. The role of chemosensory systems in conspecific recognition recapitulates their place in natural and sexual selection. Chemosensory cues offer initial information on potential mates, such as size, age, and environment. An organism's integration of these cues allows them to choose mates that provide increased fitness. Divergence of pheromones and their receptors lead to various expression patterns within populations that may then be selected upon. This variation of hormone expression has been studied in numerous biological systems. For example, two populations that are not spatially isolated, yet form a species complex with several monophyletic types may require specific chemical identification for proper intraspecific communication and mate selection. An example of this intraspecific communication barrier is seen in two co-habitual populations of the Iberian wall lizard, Podarcis hispanica; the males of the two species emit different pheromone assemblages and can discriminate the types of cues, however, the females were unable to discriminate between the two pheromone cues. The behavioral and evolutionary impacts of these relationships are commonly underlined in more recent sexual selection models, such as the good genes (sexy son hypothesis) and the sensory bias model.
