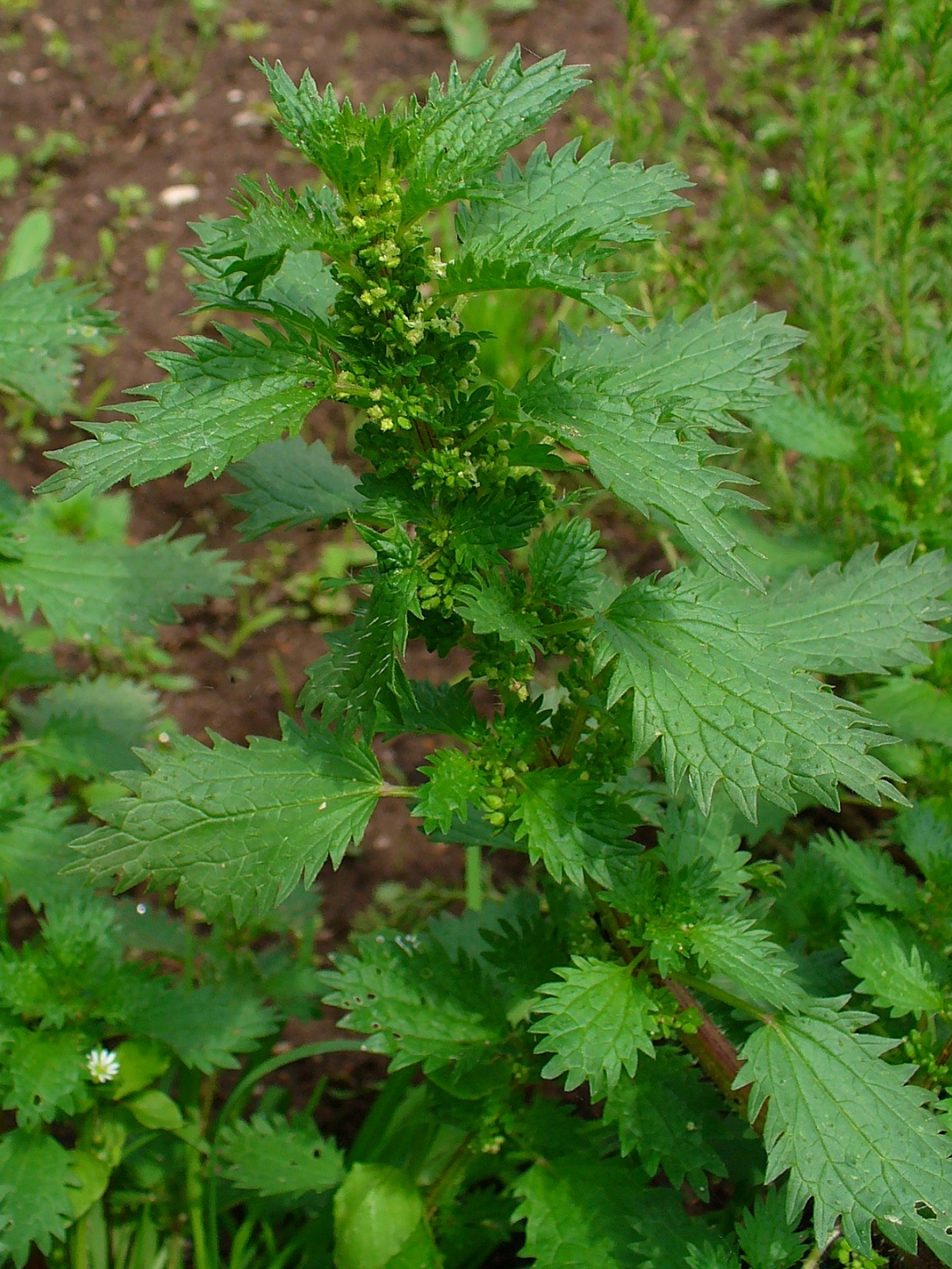

Scientific classification
- Kingdom: Plantae
- Clade: Embryophytes
- Clade: Tracheophytes
- Clade: Spermatophytes
- Clade: Angiosperms
- Clade: Eudicots
- Clade: Rosids
- Order: Rosales
- Family: Urticaceae
- Genus: Urtica
- Species: U. urens

Binomial name
- Urtica urens L.

Synonyms
- Urtica atlantica Blume; Urtica cubensis Klotzsch ex Herder; Urtica minor Garsault; Urtica minor Lam.; Urtica minor Moench; Urtica monoica Gilib.; Urtica ovalifolia Stokes; Urtica parvula Blume; Urtica quadristipulata Dulac; Urtica trianae Rusby; Urtica urens f. major Zapał.; Urtica urens f. microphylla Murr; Urtica urens f. montana Zapał.; Urtica urens var. lanceolata E.Nilsson; Urtica urens var. podolica Zapał

= Urtica urens =

Species of flowering plant in the nettle family

Urtica urens, commonly known as annual nettle, dwarf nettle, small nettle, dog nettle, burning nettle, or bush nettle is a herbaceous annual flowering plant species in the nettle family Urticaceae. It is native to Eurasia, including the Himalayan regions of Kalimpong, Darjeeling and Sikkim in India and can be found in North America, New Zealand and South Africa as an introduced species. It is reputed to sting more strongly than Urtica dioica (common nettle).

== Description ==
Urtica urens is an annual plant, monoecious (with male and female flowers on the same plant) and generally much shorter. It can be distinguished from the perennial and dioecious U. dioica (stinging nettle) by its more rounded leaves with coarser, deeper toothing and with the terminal tooth of similar length to the adjacent teeth. The lower leaves are shorter than their longer petioles and have stinging hairs only.

== Distribution ==
The native distribution of Urtica urens includes most of Europe except the British Isles, northern Asia, north and northwest Africa.

In the British Isles, Urtica urens is an archaeophyte, an ancient introduction. It has been introduced to all other continents of the world except Antarctica.

== Organism interactions ==
In Europe, Urtica urens is one of the food plants of the small tortoiseshell butterfly (Aglais urticae). In New Zealand it is also a food plant for the New Zealand red admiral butterfly (Bassaris gonerilla, syn. Vanessa gonerilla, syn. Papilio gonerilla), and the Australian / New Zealand yellow admiral butterfly (Vanessa itea).
