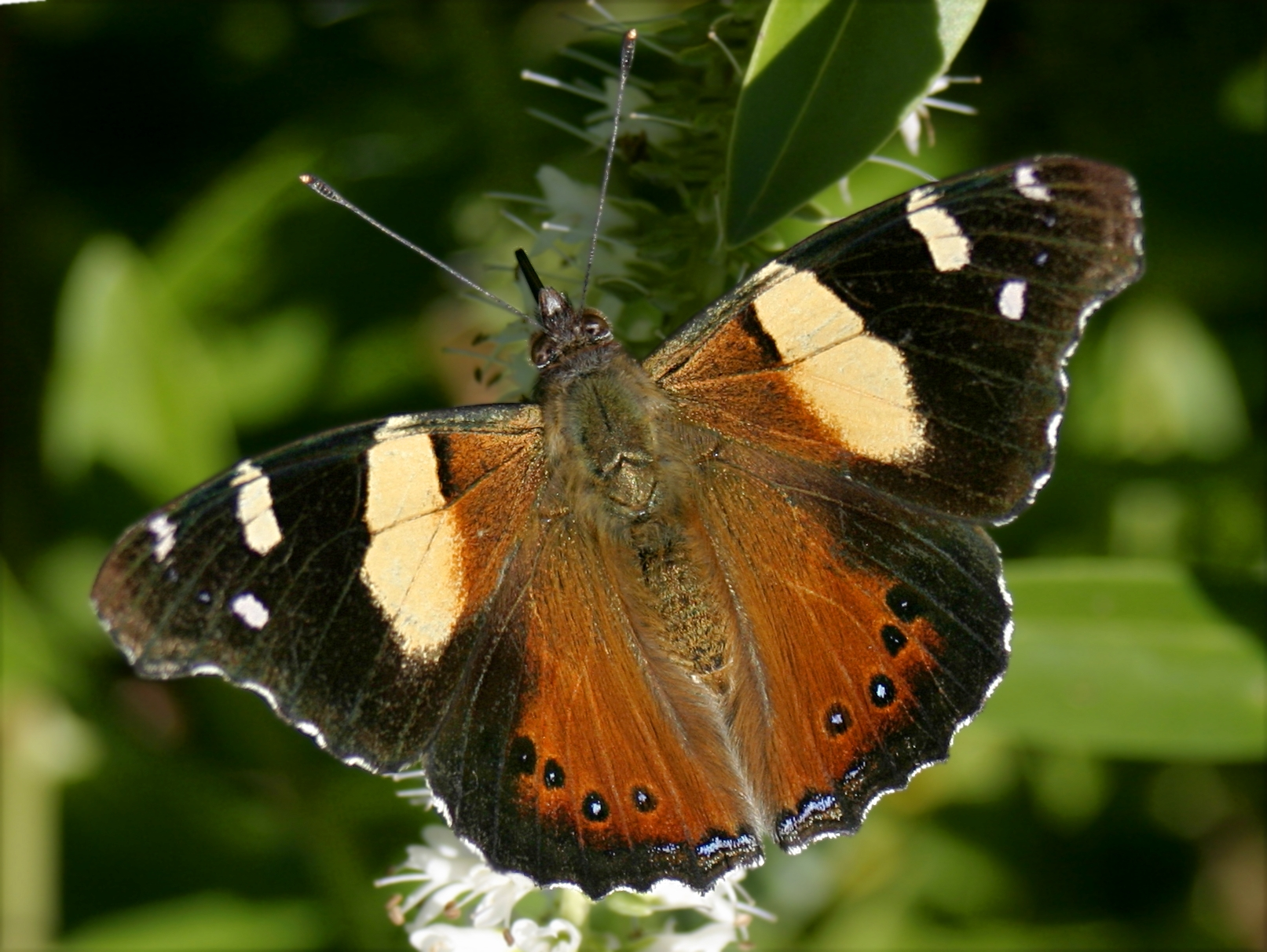

Scientific classification
- Kingdom: Animalia
- Phylum: Arthropoda
- Clade: Pancrustacea
- Class: Insecta
- Order: Lepidoptera
- Family: Nymphalidae
- Genus: Vanessa
- Species: V. itea

Binomial name
- Vanessa itea (Fabricius, 1775)

Synonyms
- Bassaris itea

= Yellow admiral =

Species of butterfly

The yellow admiral or Australian admiral (Vanessa itea) is a butterfly native to Australia, New Zealand, Lord Howe Island, and Norfolk Islands. The Māori name is kahukōwhai, which means "yellow cloak". The yellow admiral is a member of the family Nymphalidae, the subfamily Nymphalinae and the tribe Nymphalini.

== Description ==
The yellow admiral is a medium-sized butterfly, with a variable wingspan of 48 to 50 mm in Tasmania, and 48 to 55 mm in New Zealand. The upperside of the forewings are dark brown to black toward the outer edges, with three small white patches and a wide, bright yellow bar, and dull red nearer the body. The rear wings are dull red with a black border, and a row of black circles with light blue centres near the edge.

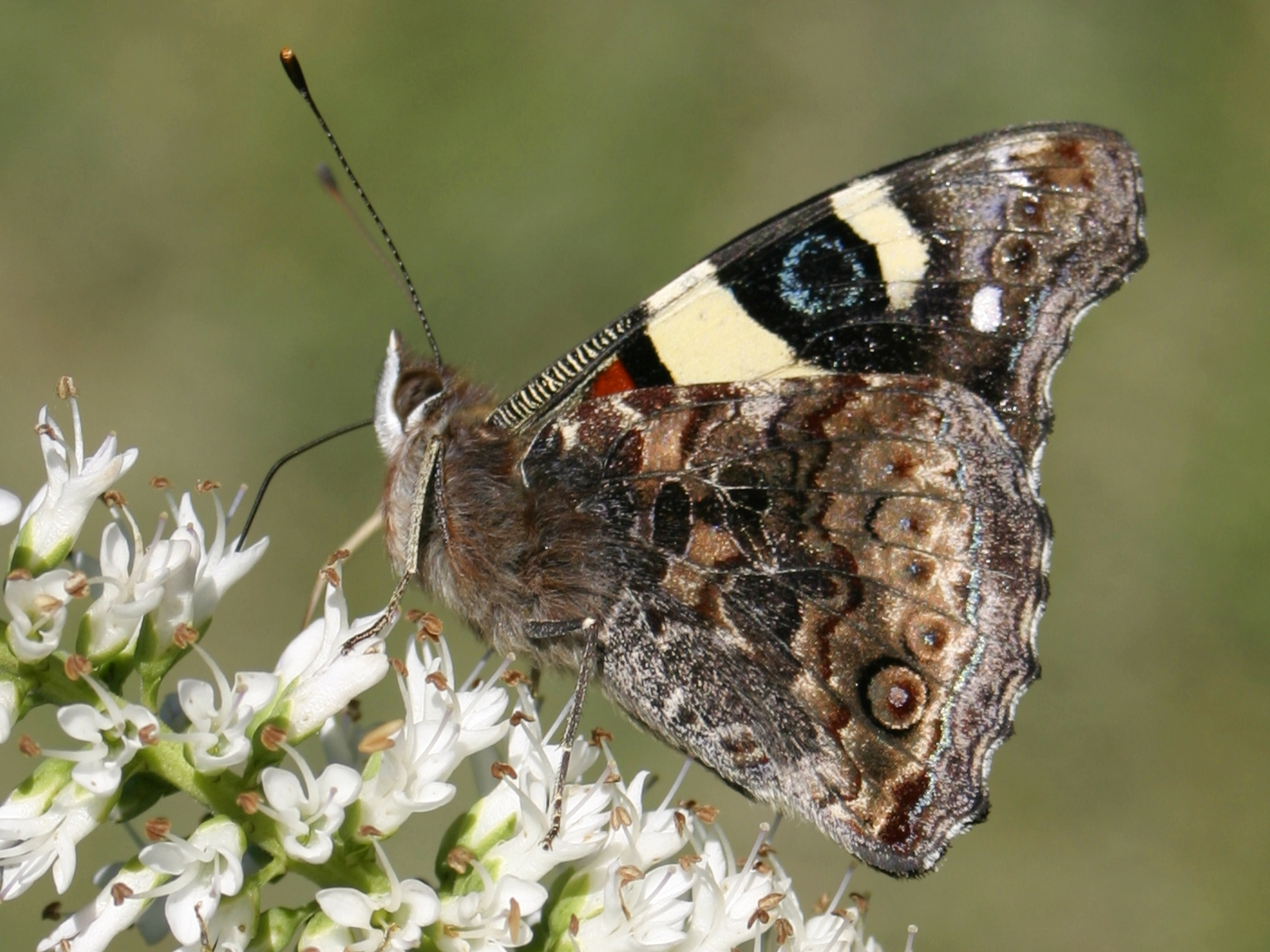
Underwing detail

The underwings are very different – the rear wing is various shades of brown with cryptic, irregular markings; the underside of the forewing has a blue eyespot on a black background that is highlighted by a yellow area above and below.

== Distribution and habitat ==
Yellow admirals are relatively common throughout their range wherever their food plants occur. They prefer open country, wastelands and gardens where the stinging nettles Urtica incisa and Urtica urens are present. It is found at up to 1000 m above sea level. Adults are also attracted to butterfly bush (Buddleja sp.).

It is a strong, fast flier, and is thought to survive wind-blown travel from Australia to New Zealand, across the Tasman Sea.

== Life cycle ==
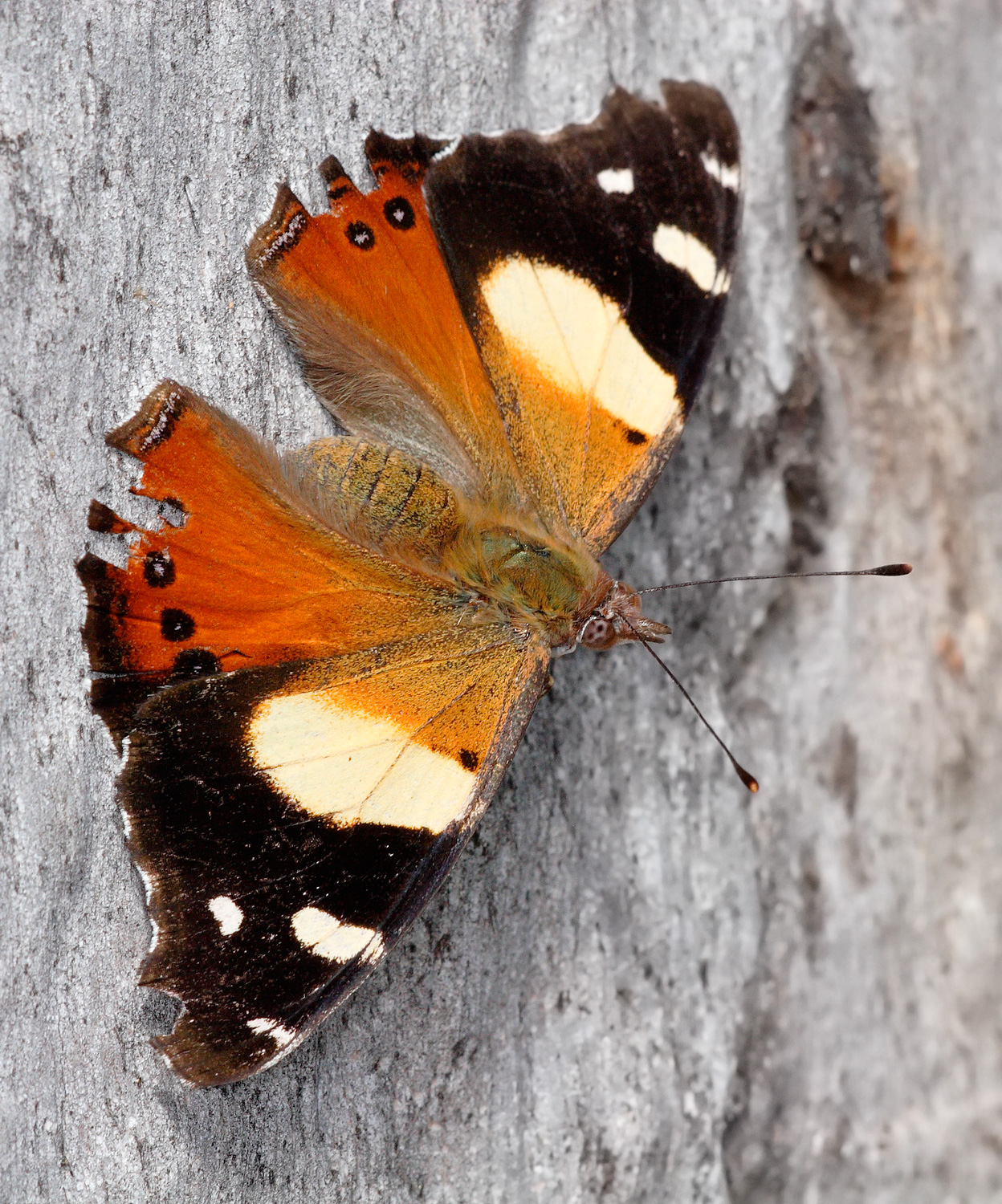
Being long lived they often end up with damaged wing tips.

=== Eggs ===
The eggs are light green, ribbed and barrel shaped. They are usually laid singly, sometimes in pairs, onto the nettle leaves that the larva eat.

=== Larva ===
The caterpillars vary from black to grey, yellow-green or brown, with lighter coloured lines and spots running laterally along its back. They are covered in several rows of spiny protrusions. They have six true legs, and ten prolegs.

They prefer to eat nettles and, depending upon availability, feed on Urtica incisa, Urtica urens, Parietaria debilis, Pipturus argenteus, Parietaria australis, Parietaria cardiostegia, Parietaria judaica, and Soleirolia soleirolii. They feed at night; during the day they hide in a curled leaf for protection.

They grow to about 30 mm long before pupating. The pupa is about 20 mm long and is grey or brownish, with sharp bumps and has two white/silver spots on each side.

=== Adult ===
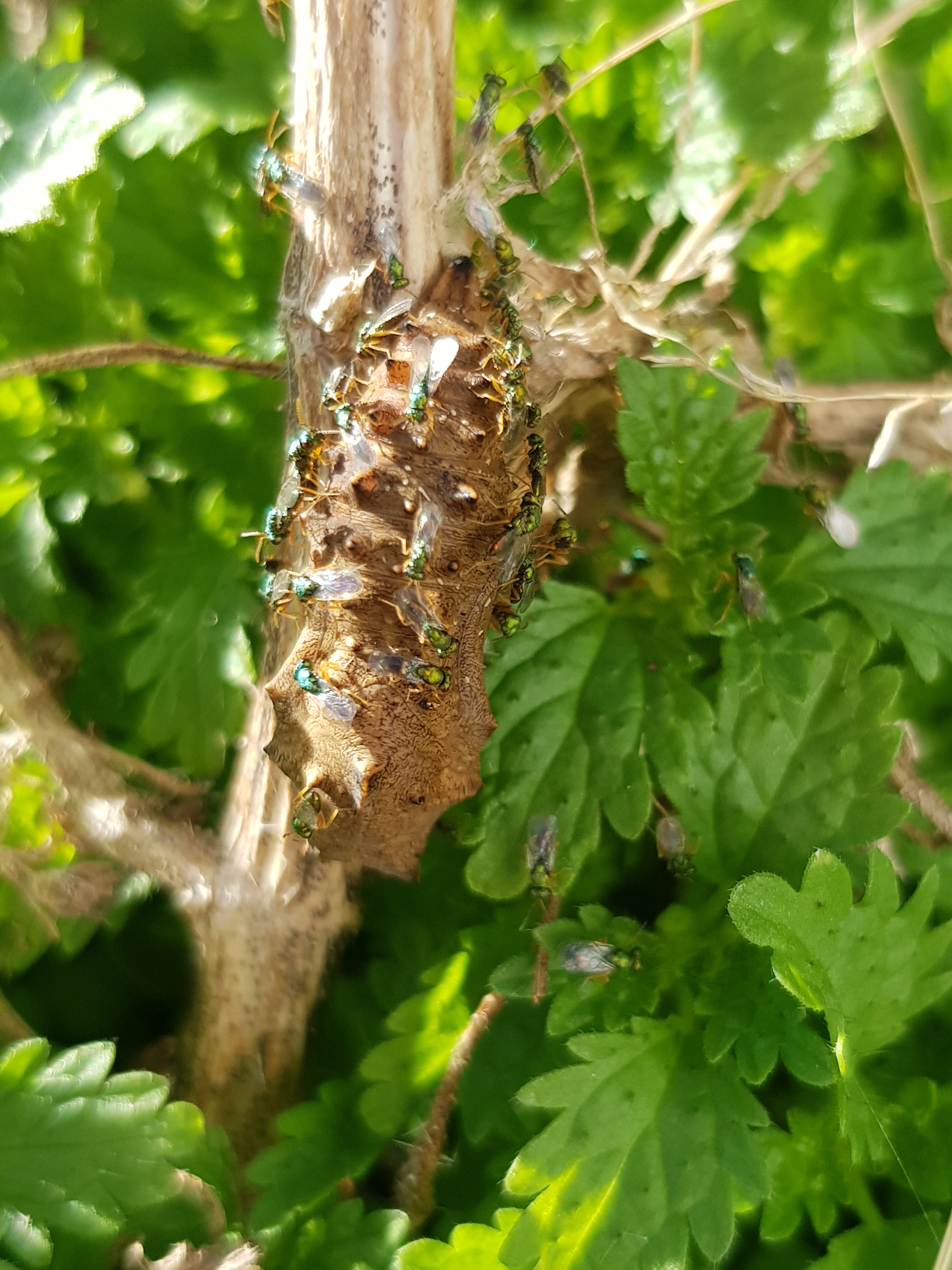
Yellow admiral cocoon covered in Pteromalus puparum wasps

The flight period of the adult covers all the warmer months of the year and so varies with location, e.g. in Tasmania it is from November to May, while in Victoria it is from September to April. Individuals may live for several months. The adults feed on nectar from available flowers, and sometimes sap seepage from trees. Normally the last of the season's brood survive as larvae until the next season, but in some areas it survives as a dormant adult over winter.

== Parasites ==
In New Zealand the pupae have been parasitised by the self-introduced wasp species Echthromorpha intricatoria and the introduced wasp Pteromalus puparum.

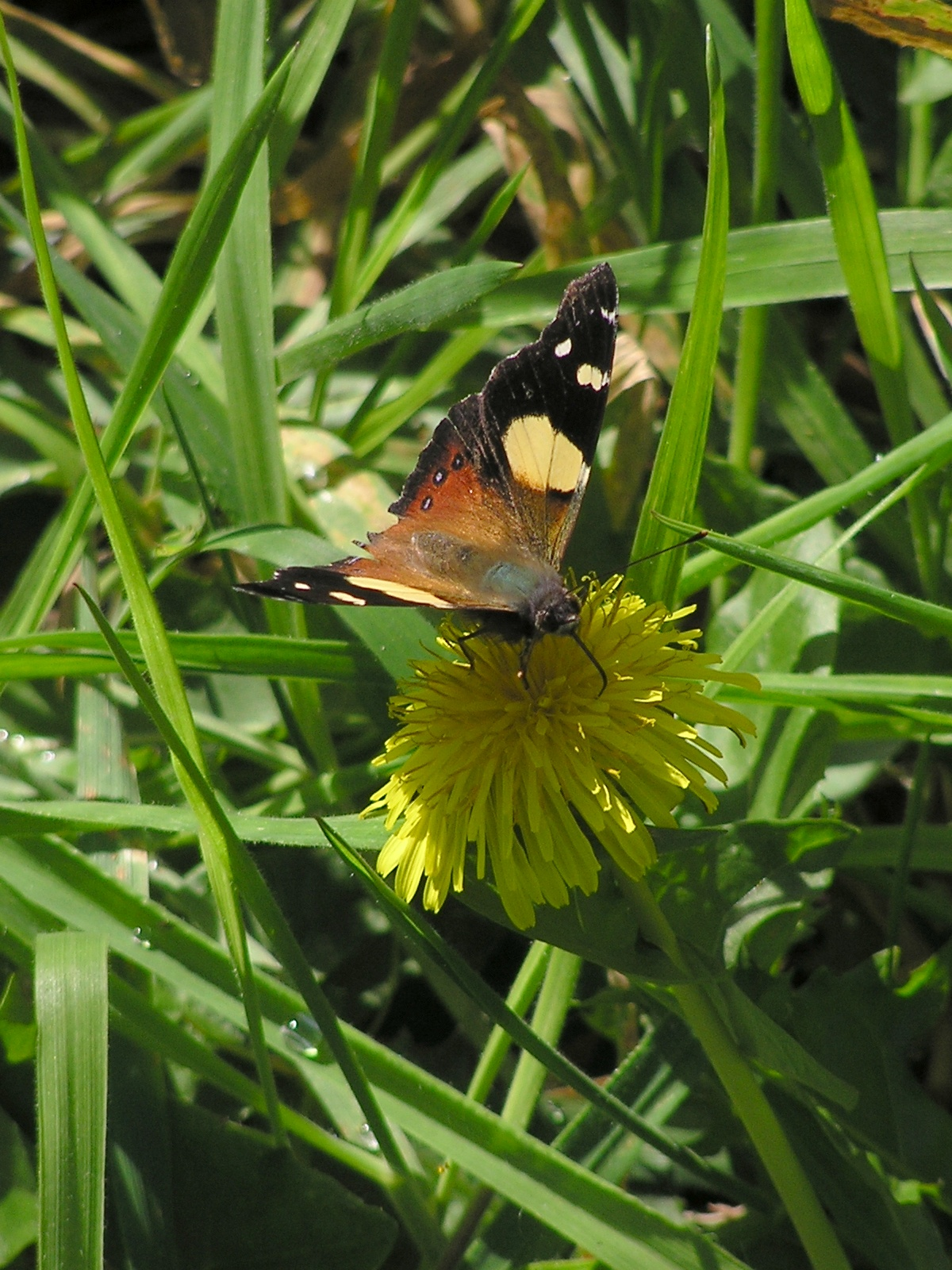
Feeding on nectar

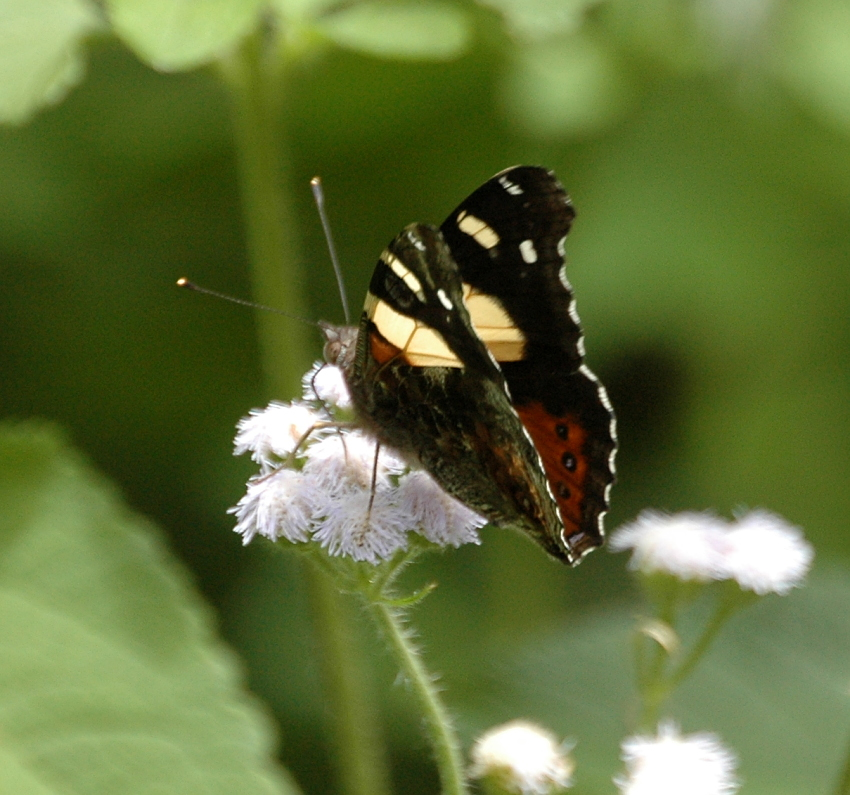
Mount Mee, Queensland, Australia
