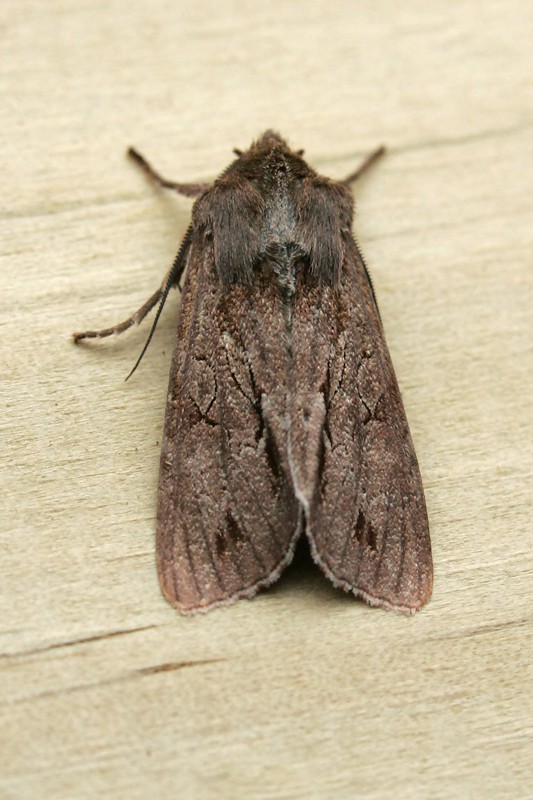

Scientific classification
- Kingdom: Animalia
- Phylum: Arthropoda
- Clade: Pancrustacea
- Class: Insecta
- Order: Lepidoptera
- Superfamily: Noctuoidea
- Family: Noctuidae
- Genus: Ichneutica
- Species: I. rufistriga

Binomial name
- Ichneutica rufistriga Hoare, 2019

= Ichneutica rufistriga =

Species of moth

Ichneutica rufistriga is a moth of the family Noctuidae. This species is endemic to New Zealand and is only found in the Antipodes Islands. The larvae of I. rufistriga feed on various host species including Urtica australis and have been reared on Rumex obtusifolius, Stellaria media and Rheum rhabarbarum. It has been hypothesised the larvae might also feed on Austroblechnum durum. The larvae pupate in a cocoon buried in the soil. In captivity it took 12 weeks to raise a generation from egg to adult. Adults of this species have been recorded as being on the wing from October to February.

== Taxonomy ==
This species was first described by Robert Hoare in 2019. The male holotype specimen was collected at Reef Point on Antipodes Island and reared by Brian H. Patrick. This specimen is held at the New Zealand Arthropod Collection.

== Description ==
The larvae of this species have been described as pale green becoming reddish and as they mature they have a "broad white lateral band and three thin white dorsal lines on a dull green / brown ground colour, with rows of black dots dorsally". The mature larvae were described by Brian H. Patrick as follows:

larvae were up to 42 mm long, dorsally dull yellow-green with a double black dorsal line, sub-dorsal black line with a row of green dots within it. A wide yellowish band separates the sub-dorsal line from a broad yellow-white lateral band. A black dashed line marks the border of these two bands. Ventrally the larvae are plain dull yellow.

The wingspan of the adult male of I. rufistriga is between 38 and 44 mm and for the adult female is between 37 and 44 mm. This species is unlikely to be confused with other species found in the Antipodes Islands. It has been confused with I. ustistriga in collections but is smaller in size, has narrower forewings and the markings on its forewings are not as contrasting as with I. ustistriga.

== Distribution ==
This species is endemic to New Zealand and is only found in the Antipodes Islands.

== Behaviour ==
Adults of this species have been recorded as being on the wing from October to February.

== Life history and host species ==
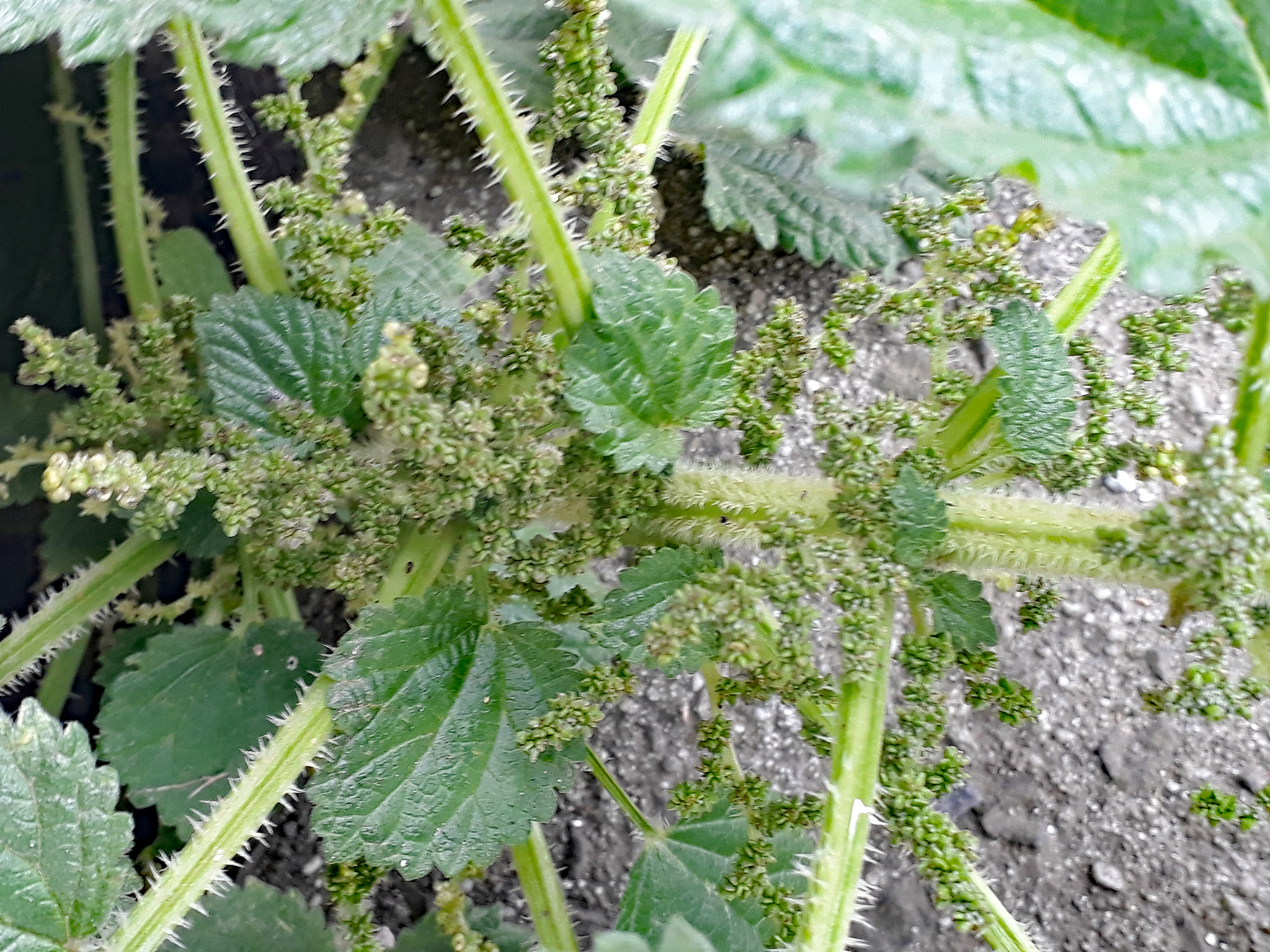
Urtica australis, a host species of I. rufistriga

The larvae of I. rufistriga feed on various host species including Urtica australis and have been reared on Rumex obtusifolius, Stellaria media and Rheum rhabarbarum. It has been hypothesised the larvae might also feed on Austroblechnum durum. The larvae pupate in a cocoon buried in the soil. In captivity it took 12 weeks to raise a generation from egg to adult.
