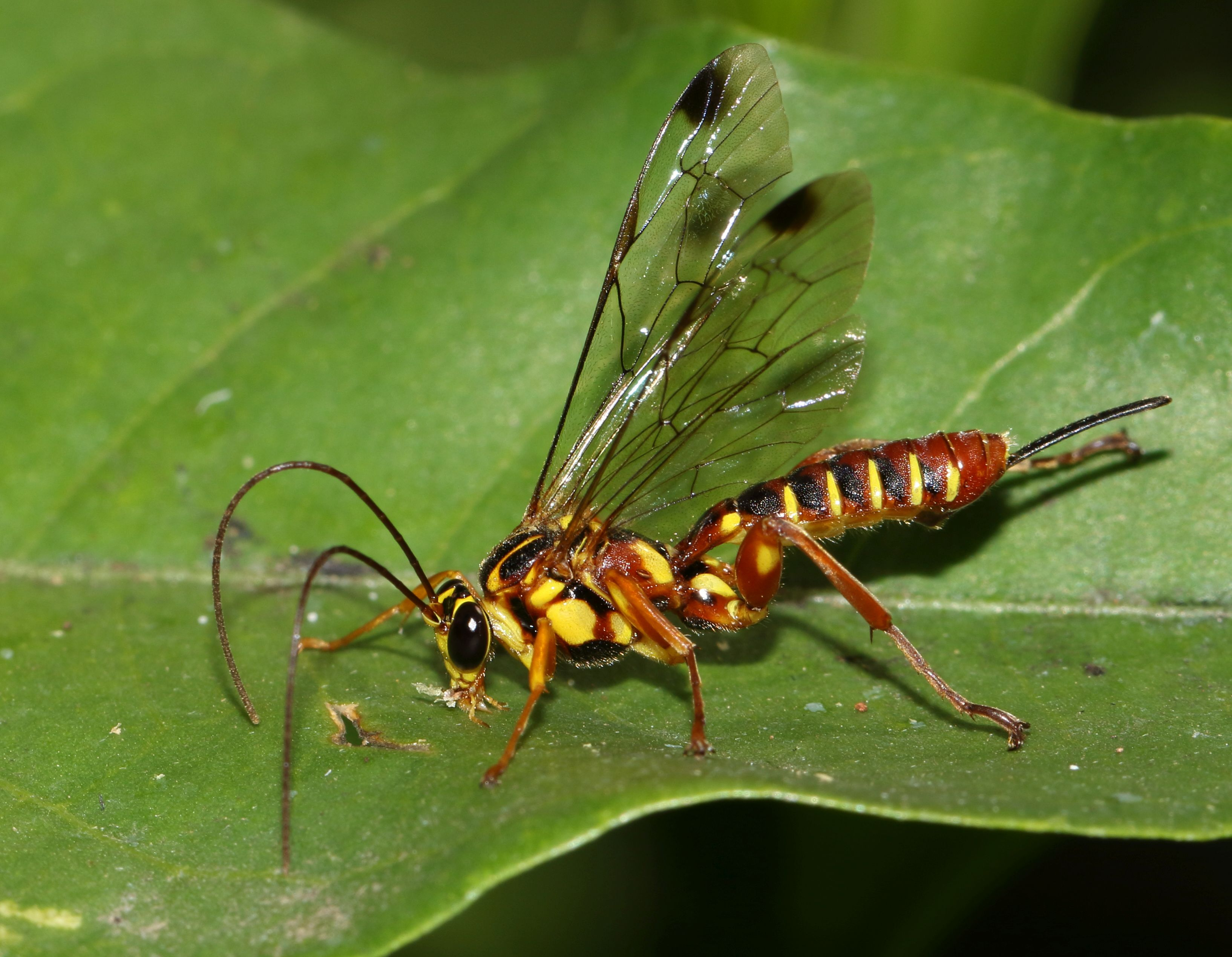
- Echthromorpha agrestoria

Scientific classification
- Kingdom: Animalia
- Phylum: Arthropoda
- Clade: Pancrustacea
- Class: Insecta
- Order: Hymenoptera
- Family: Ichneumonidae
- Subfamily: Pimplinae
- Tribe: Pimplini
- Genus: Echthromorpha; Holmgren, 1868

Synonyms
- Notiopimpla Vachal, 1907

= Echthromorpha =

Genus of insects

Echthromorpha is a widespread genus of the parasitic wasp family Ichneumonidae.

Echthromorpha species are parasitoids of insects, usually the pupae of Lepidoptera.

== Species ==
There are 14 species:

- Echthromorpha agrestoria (Swederus, 1787)
- Echthromorpha ashmeadi (Perkins, 1910)
- Echthromorpha ceramocare (Vachal, 1907)
- Echthromorpha gnathon Krieger, 1909
- Echthromorpha hawaiiensis (Ashmead, 1900)
- Echthromorpha inimica (Smith, 1863)
- Echthromorpha intricatoria (Fabricius, 1804)
- Echthromorpha marquisensis Cheesman, 1928
- Echthromorpha nigricornis (Smith, 1865)
- Echthromorpha nukuhivae Perkins, 1952
- Echthromorpha plagiata (Smith, 1858)
- Echthromorpha quodi (Vachal, 1907)
- Echthromorpha tirathabae Perkins, 1937
- Echthromorpha walkeri Cameron, 1886

== Distribution ==
These wasps are found in the Afrotropical, Indomalayan, Australasian, and Oceanian realms. Most species have restricted distributions in Australasia and Oceania, but Echthromorpha agrestoria is widespread from Africa to Oceania.

== Gallery ==
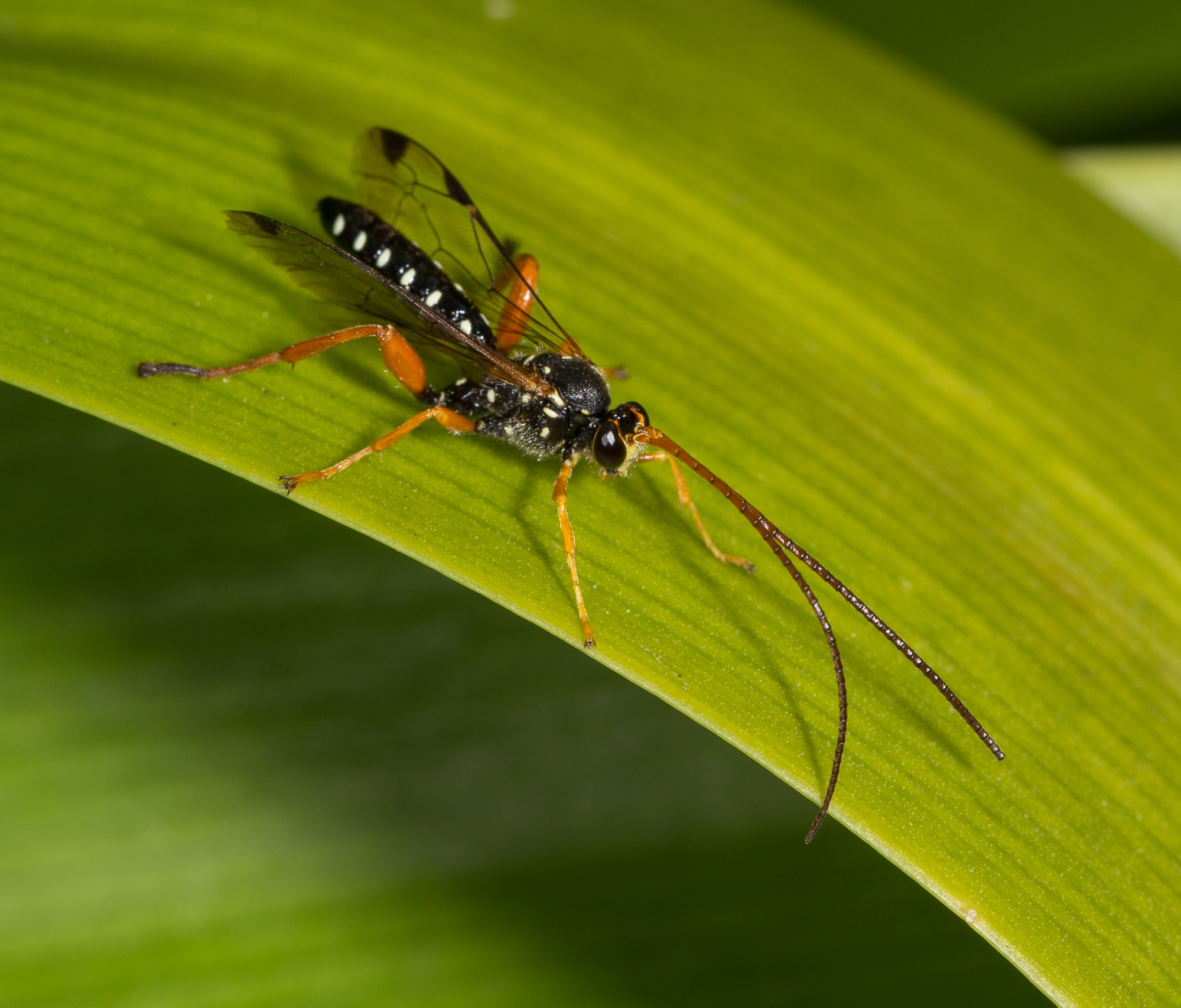
Echthromorpha intricatoria
