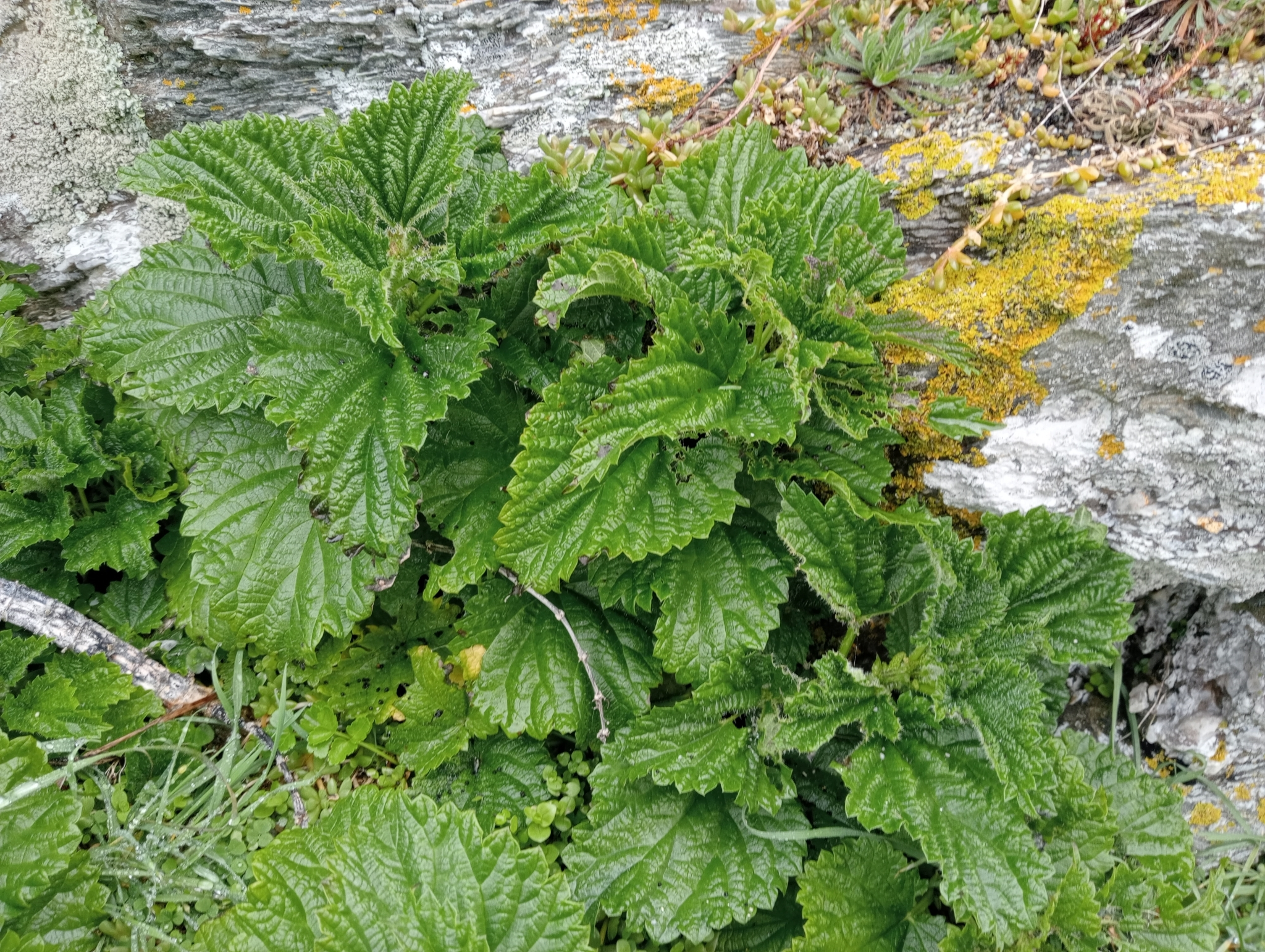
- U. australis's leaves

Conservation status
- Declining (NZ TCS)

Scientific classification
- Kingdom: Plantae
- Clade: Embryophytes
- Clade: Tracheophytes
- Clade: Spermatophytes
- Clade: Angiosperms
- Clade: Eudicots
- Clade: Rosids
- Order: Rosales
- Family: Urticaceae
- Genus: Urtica
- Species: U. australis

Binomial name
- Urtica australis Hook.f.

Synonyms
- Urtica aucklandica Hook.f.

= Urtica australis =

Species of flowering plant

Urtica australis, commonly known as southern nettle and onga, is a species of nettle endemic to New Zealand's southern and subantarctic islands. A member of the Urticaceae, this species is found near the coast, and can be present on rocky beaches and sand dunes. It grows in a dense, bushy manner. It was first described by the British botanist Joseph Dalton Hooker in 1844. Its specific epithet, australis, means 'southern'.

== Description ==
Urtica australis (southern nettle) is a stout, dense, bushy, shrub that reaches 1 by 1 metre (3 feet 3 inches by 3 feet 3 inches) in diameter. The base can be somewhat woody. The plant can also be semideciduous. The petioles are up to 50 mm long. Leaves are dark green, 100–150 mm long and 80–140 mm wide, with a heart-shaped base. The margins are usually coarsely toothed, sometimes nearly smooth, and rarely completely smooth. The stinging hairs or trichomes are mainly found along the leaf edges and veins on the underside, and may be sparse or absent. Flowering occurs from December to January. The achenes are 1.5–2 mm long, and pale brown.

== Taxonomy ==
Urtica australis was first described by the British botanist Joseph Dalton Hooker in 1844. U. aucklandica is a synonym of the species. There are sixty-nine species of the Urtica genus currently accepted by the Plants of the World Online taxonomic database. These species are found throughout the entire world. There are six species native to New Zealand. U. australis is closely related to other New Zealand members of the genus Urtica except U. ferox. Grosse‐Veldmann et al. (2016) constructed a phylogenetic tree of the genus Urtica based on gender characteristics and genetic sequencing.

=== Etymology ===
The etymology (word origin) of U. australis's genus name, Urtica, is derived from the Latin word for stinging nettles, which comes from urere, meaning to burn. The specific epithet (second part of the scientific name), australis, means 'southern'. The species is commonly known as 'southern nettle' and 'onga'.

== Distribution ==
Urtica australis is endemic to New Zealand. The species is found in the south-western coast of Fiordland (in the South Island). It is also found on Chatham, Stewart, and other main subantarctic islands. The 2023 assessment of U. australis in the New Zealand Threat Classification System was "At Risk – Declining".

=== Habitat ===
Urtica australis is typically found near the coast, and can be present on rocky beaches, sand dunes, and scrublands.

== Ecology ==
All Urtica species are pollinated by the wind. U. australis plays host to the Chatham Island red admiral (Vanessa gonerilla ida).

== Works cited ==
Books

- Allan, H.H (1961). Flora of New Zealand. Vol. 1. P D Hasselberg Government Printer Publications. ISBN 9780477010566.
- Friis, I. (1993). "Urticaceae". Flowering Plants · Dicotyledons. Berlin, Heidelberg: Springer Berlin Heidelberg. doi:10.1007/978-3-662-02899-5_76. ISBN 978-3-642-08141-5.

Journals

- Grosse-Veldmann, Bernadette; Nürk, Nicolai M.; Smissen, Rob; Breitwieser, Ilse; Quandt, Dietmar; Weigend, Maximilian (2016). "Pulling the sting out of nettle systematics – A comprehensive phylogeny of the genus Urtica L. (Urticaceae)". Molecular Phylogenetics and Evolution. 102. Elsevier BV: 9–19. doi:10.1016/j.ympev.2016.05.019. ISSN 1055-7903.
- Grosse-Veldmann, Bernadette; Conn, Barry J; Weigend, Maximilian (2016). "Weeding the nettles IV: A redefinition of Urtica incisa and allies in New Zealand and Australia, including the segregation of two new species Urtica sykesii and U. perconfusa". Phytotaxa. 245 (4): 251. doi:10.11646/phytotaxa.245.4.2. ISSN 1179-3163.
- Grosse‐Veldmann, Bernadette; Weigend, Maximilian (2018). "The geometry of gender: hyper‐diversification of sexual systems in Urtica L. (Urticaceae)". Cladistics. 34 (2): 131–150. doi:10.1111/cla.12193. ISSN 0748-3007.

Websites

- De Lange, Peter (2026). "Urtica australis". New Zealand Plant Conservation Network. Archived from the original on 14 February 2025.
- "Urtica L." Plants of the World Online. Archived from the original on 12 November 2025 – via Royal Botanic Gardens, Kew.
- "Urtica australis Hook.f., Bot. Antarct. Voy. I. (Fl. Antarct.). 1: 68 (1844)". The Royal Botanic Gardens, Kew, Harvard University Herbaria & Libraries and Australian National Herbarium. International Plant Names Index. 2026. Archived from the original on 4 December 2024.
