= Urtica incisa =

- Foliage of Urtica incisa

Scientific classification
- Kingdom: Plantae
- Clade: Tracheophytes
- Clade: Angiosperms
- Clade: Eudicots
- Clade: Rosids
- Order: Rosales
- Family: Urticaceae
- Genus: Urtica
- Species: U. incisa

Binomial name
- Urtica incisa Poir.

Species of flowering plant

Urtica incisa, commonly known as scrub nettle and stinging nettle, is a species of nettle native to Australia. It is also sparingly naturalised in New Zealand. A member of the Urticaceae, this species is typically found in disturbed areas in various habitats. It was first described by the French botanist Jean Louis Marie Poiret in 1816. Its specific epithet, incisa, comes from the Latin incidere, which refers to the incised leaves.

== Description ==
Urtica incisa (stinging nettle) is a mostly dioecious rhizomatous species of herb growing up to 2 metres (6 feet 7 inches) in height. The plant is usually unbranched. The stems have stinging hairs or trichomes which are about 0.2–0.3 mm long. The leaves are light green in colour, usually 60–120 mm long and 15–30 mm wide, and shaped from triangular-ovate to narrow oblong. They are lightly hairy, with short stinging hairs which are about 0.2–0.5 mm long, and some stinging hairs found mainly on the underside veins. The petioles are usually 15–25 mm long.

The inflorescences (flower clusters) are typically 24–40 mm long. The fruits are nearly circular and 1.3–1.5 mm long. A peptide called Δ-Ui1a was identified in U. incisa by a 2022 study.

== Taxonomy ==
Urtica incisa was first described by the French botanist Jean Louis Marie Poiret in 1816. There are sixty-nine species of the Urtica genus currently accepted by the Plants of the World Online taxonomic database. These species are found throughout the entire world. U. incisa is closely related to other New Zealand members of the genus Urtica except U. ferox. Grosse‐Veldmann et al. (2016) constructed a phylogenetic tree of the genus Urtica based on gender characteristics and genetic sequencing.

=== Etymology ===
The etymology (word origin) of U. incisa's genus name, Urtica, is derived from the Latin word for stinging nettles, which comes from urere, meaning to burn. The specific epithet (second part of the scientific name), incisa, comes from the Latin incidere, which refers to the incised leaves. The species is commonly known as 'scrub nettle' and 'stinging nettle'.

== Distribution ==
Urtica incisa is widely distributed in south-eastern Australia and Tasmania. It is also sparingly naturalised in New Zealand.

=== Habitat ===
Urtica incisa is commonly found in disturbed areas in swamps and on riverbanks. Its altitudinal range is from about 0–250 m (0–820 ft) above sea level.

== Ecology ==
All Urtica species are pollinated by the wind. U. incisa plays host to the yellow admiral butterfly (Vanessa itea).

== Works cited ==
Books

- Braby, Michael (2016). The Complete Field Guide to Butterflies of Australia. Clayton, Australia: Csiro Publishing. ISBN 1-4863-0102-9.
- Friis, I. (1993). "Urticaceae". Flowering Plants · Dicotyledons. Berlin, Heidelberg: Springer Berlin Heidelberg. doi:10.1007/978-3-662-02899-5_76. ISBN 978-3-642-08141-5.
- Richardson, Robert Grahame; Richardson, Fiona J.; Shepherd, Rosamond Charmian Hollis (10 April 2025). Weeds of the South-East. Collingwood: CSIRO Publishing. ISBN 978-1-4863-1704-2.

Journals

- Grosse-Veldmann, Bernadette; Nürk, Nicolai M.; Smissen, Rob; Breitwieser, Ilse; Quandt, Dietmar; Weigend, Maximilian (2016). "Pulling the sting out of nettle systematics – A comprehensive phylogeny of the genus Urtica L. (Urticaceae)". Molecular Phylogenetics and Evolution. 102. Elsevier BV: 9–19. doi:10.1016/j.ympev.2016.05.019. ISSN 1055-7903.
- Grosse-Veldmann, Bernadette; Conn, Barry J; Weigend, Maximilian (2016). "Weeding the nettles IV: A redefinition of Urtica incisa and allies in New Zealand and Australia, including the segregation of two new species Urtica sykesii and U. perconfusa". Phytotaxa. 245 (4): 251. doi:10.11646/phytotaxa.245.4.2. ISSN 1179-3163.
- Grosse‐Veldmann, Bernadette; Weigend, Maximilian (2018). "The geometry of gender: hyper‐diversification of sexual systems in Urtica L. (Urticaceae)". Cladistics. 34 (2): 131–150. doi:10.1111/cla.12193. ISSN 0748-3007.
- Xie, Jing; Robinson, Samuel D.; Gilding, Edward K.; Jami, Sina; Deuis, Jennifer R.; Rehm, Fabian B.H.; Yap, Kuok; Ragnarsson, Lotten; Chan, Lai Yue; Hamilton, Brett R.; Harvey, Peta J.; Craik, David J.; Vetter, Irina; Durek, Thomas (2022). "Neurotoxic and cytotoxic peptides underlie the painful stings of the tree nettle Urtica ferox". Journal of Biological Chemistry. 298 (8) 102218. doi:10.1016/j.jbc.2022.102218.

Websites

- De Lange, Peter (2026). "Urtica incisa". New Zealand Plant Conservation Network. Archived from the original on 5 October 2024.
- "Urtica L." Plants of the World Online. Archived from the original on 12 November 2025 – via Royal Botanic Gardens, Kew.
- "Urtica incisa Poir., Encyc. [J. Lamarck & al.] Suppl. 4. 224 (1816)". The Royal Botanic Gardens, Kew, Harvard University Herbaria & Libraries and Australian National Herbarium. International Plant Names Index. 2026. Archived from the original on 7 November 2025.
