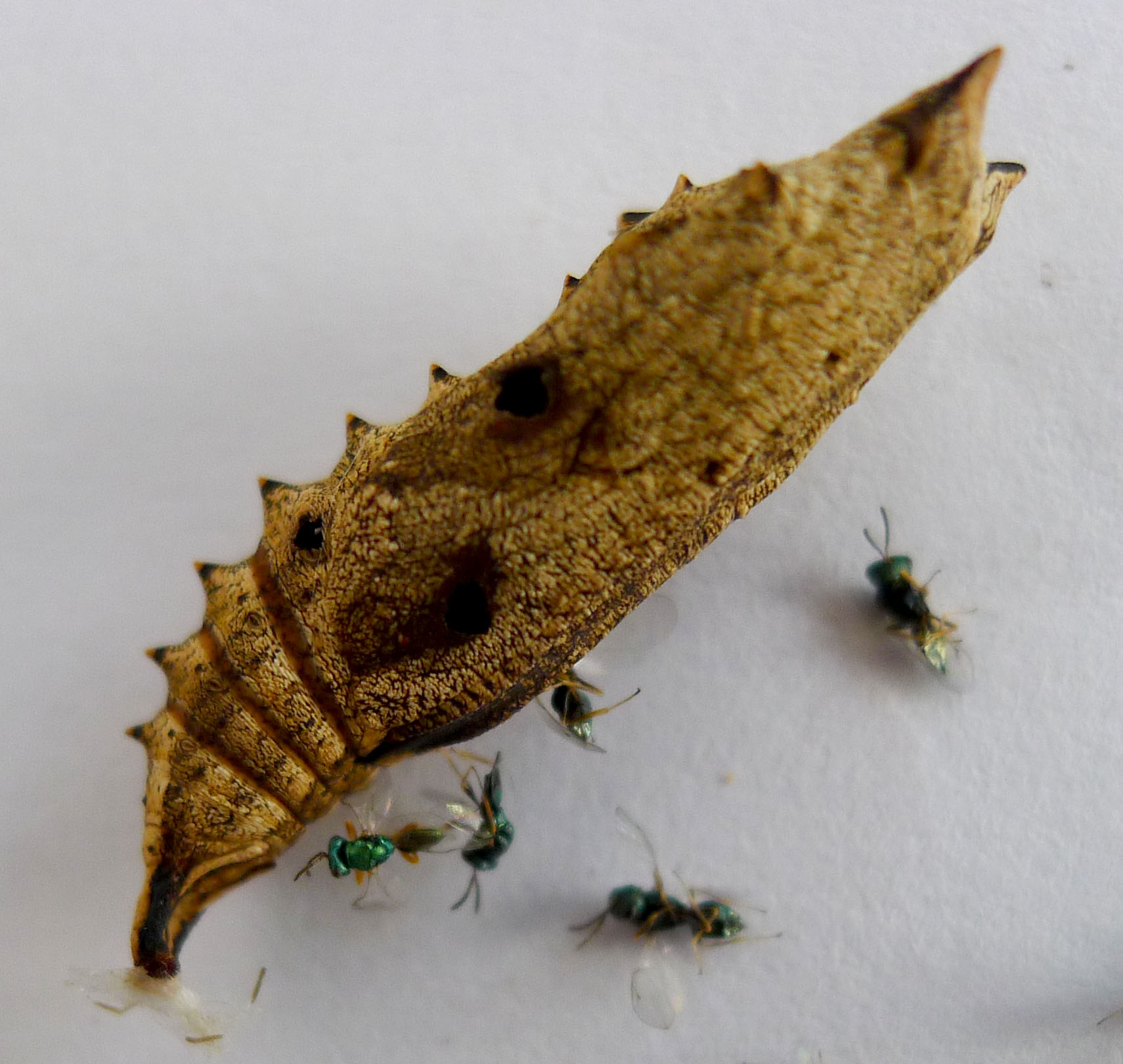
- Pteromalus puparum with chrysalis they emerged from

Scientific classification
- Kingdom: Animalia
- Phylum: Arthropoda
- Class: Insecta
- Order: Hymenoptera
- Family: Pteromalidae
- Genus: Pteromalus
- Species: P. puparum

Binomial name
- Pteromalus puparum (Linnaeus, 1758)

= Pteromalus puparum =

Parasitic wasp

Pteromalus puparum, common name white butterfly pupal parasitoid wasp, is a widely distributed species of endoparasitic wasp that oviposits in and parasitizes Lepidoptera cocoons. It is used as a biological control of the cabbage white butterfly. This wasp parasitizes a number of other species, including at least 11 kinds of swallowtail butterflies.
