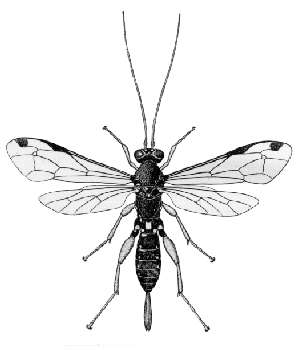

Scientific classification
- Kingdom: Animalia
- Phylum: Arthropoda
- Class: Insecta
- Order: Hymenoptera
- Family: Ichneumonidae
- Genus: Echthromorpha
- Species: E. intricatoria

Binomial name
- Echthromorpha intricatoria (Fabricius, 1804)

= Echthromorpha intricatoria =

Species of wasp

Echthromorpha intricatoria, also known as the cream-spotted ichneumon, is a common wasp found in Australia and New Zealand. It cannot sting and does not build nests, and is harmless to humans. The female injects eggs into pupae of moths and butterflies with the ovipositor, particularly favouring the Nymphalidae (admiral family). Metacrias huttoni has been shown to be a host species for E. intricatoria.

The body is mostly black with creamy plates on the sides of the abdomen. The clear wings have a span of around 3 centimetres (1.2 in). Antennae and legs are orange.

== Gallery ==
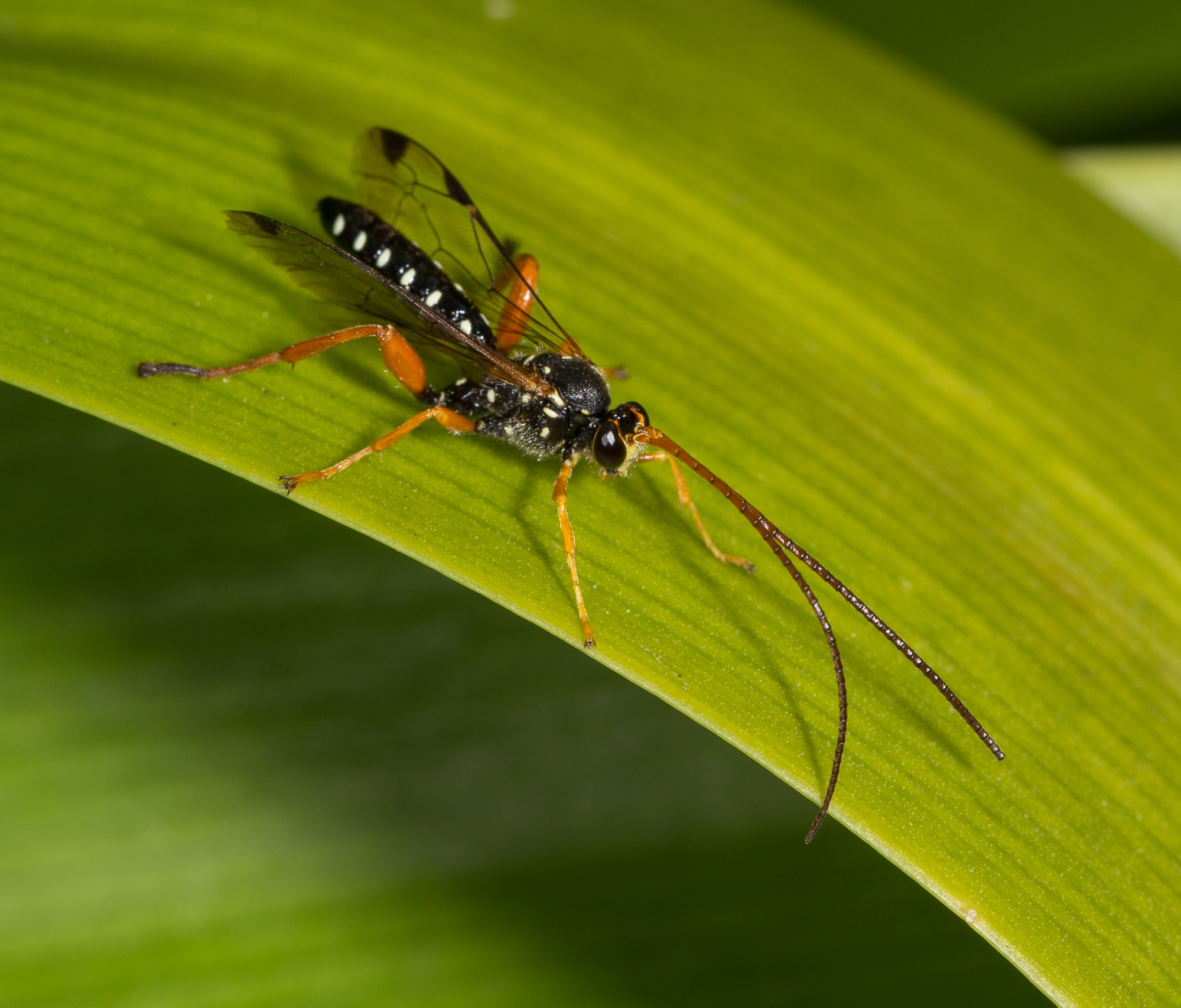
Male

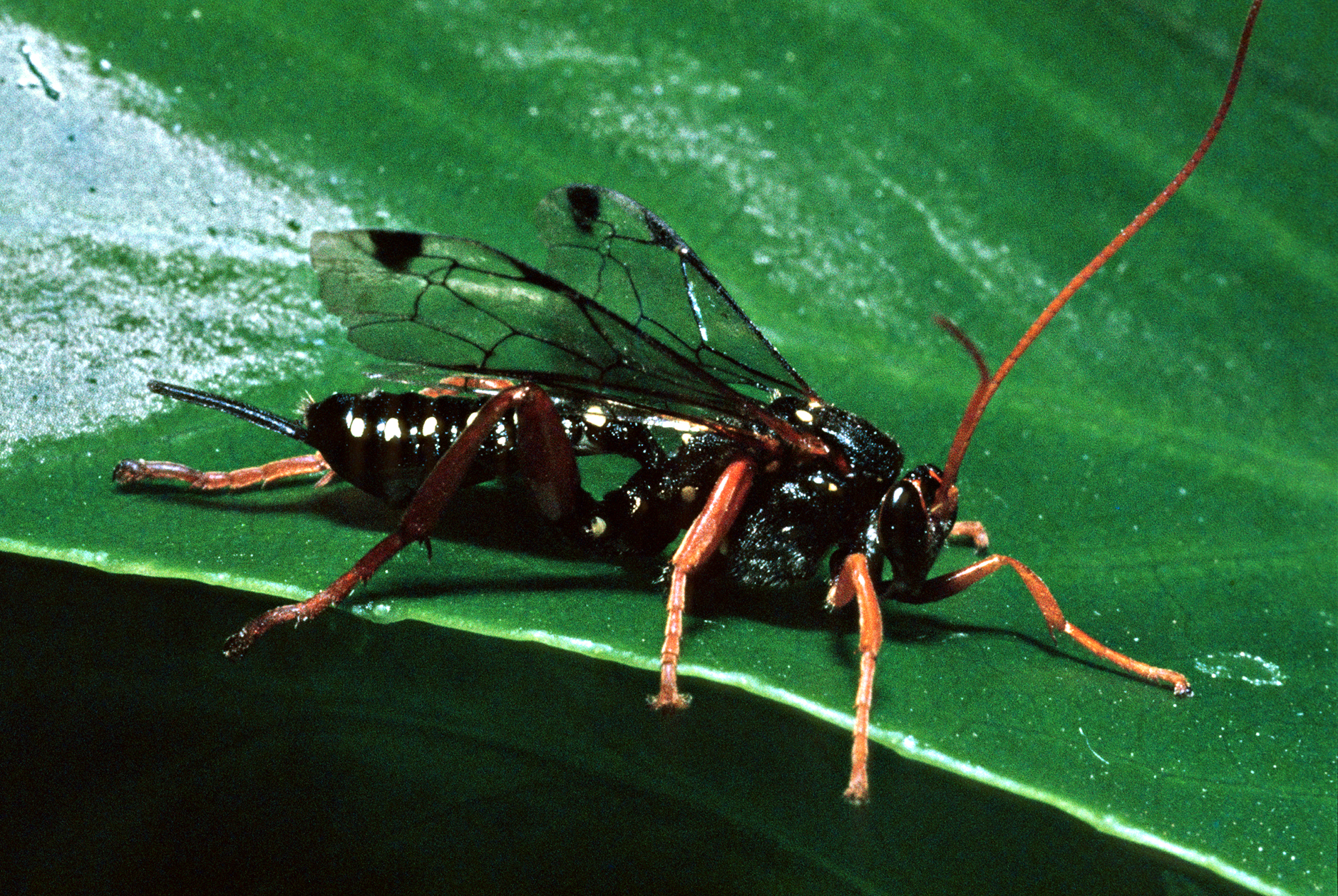
Female
