= Marshwood =

Village in Dorset, England

Coordinates: 50.7931°N 2.8776°W

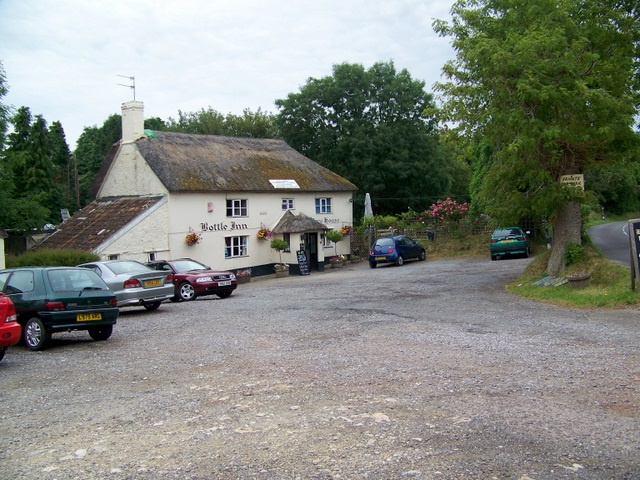
- The Bottle Inn, Marshwood

- Location within Dorset
- Population: 310
- OS grid reference: SY383997
- Unitary authority: Dorset
- Ceremonial county: Dorset
- Region: South West
- Country: England
- Sovereign state: United Kingdom
- Post town: Bridport
- Postcode district: DT6
- Police: Dorset
- Fire: Dorset and Wiltshire
- Ambulance: South Western
- UK Parliament: West Dorset

Marshwood is a village and civil parish in west Dorset, England, situated on the northern edge of the Marshwood Vale approximately 5.5 miles (8.9 km) northeast of Lyme Regis. Dorset County Council estimate that the parish had a population of 310 in 2013. Figures published from the 2011 census are for Marshwood parish combined with the small neighbouring parish of Bettiscombe: the combined population was 346.

The village school was opened in 1842 and covers the catchment areas of Marshwood, Pilsdon, Bettiscombe, and Blackdown Ward of Broadwindsor. Secondary education is provided at Woodroffe School, Lyme Regis. The church of St Mary's was built in 1840-41 and underwent a rebuild in 1883–84.

The Bottle Inn on the outskirts of Marshwood is home to the world stinging nettle eating championships. It is also the 2016 Regional (Dorset, Hampshire, Wiltshire & the Channel Islands) CAMRA winner for its range & quality of ciders & ales.

The parish contains the ruins of Marshwood Castle, which is a scheduled monument.

== Notable residents ==
- Peter De Greef (1922-1980), actor resident in the village for many years and buried in the church yard of St Mary's church
