= Nettle beer =

Nettle-based alcoholic drink

Nettle beer

Nettle beer is a fruit wine made with the leaves or buds of nettle plants. It contains relatively little alcohol; less than 2%, with a modern brew described as having a "pleasant, refreshing and slightly ginger flavour".

Nettle beer may have been produced in England during the Anglo-Saxon period. An early mention in England appears in 1836, in The Monthly Review. A recipe, published four years later in the Western Times describes:

At this season of the year a wholesome and agreeable beverage may be obtained a trifling cost, from that valuable though much despised plant, the nettle; two quarts of the sprouts of which to be boiled in one gallon of water, adding when strained off, ha a pound of sugar or treacle, with a little ginger en near cool, ferment with yeast, and bottle tight up while in state of effervescence. In a day or two this will be as brisk bottled ale, and pleasant flavour.

Preparations were similar to other home brews that were common during the 19th century in parts of the UK, using ingredients like dandelion, ginger, and gale. Nettle beer was made during the summertime. Its alcohol content, despite being relatively low, could kill bacteria, making it safer to drink than some water sources. Various curative properties were attributed to the drink, including abilities to relieve rheumatic pains and treat jaundice. Nettle beers were also drunk in 19th-century Australia, and Wilhelmina Rawson provided a recipe in her 1878 cookbook Queensland Cookery and Poultry Book. Among Australians who wanted a drink with strong alcohol content, nettle beer served as a mixer.

Alongside other herb-based brews, nettle beer remained popular in the UK into the early 20th century, when carbonated drinks began to take their place. As of the mid-20th century, Dorothy Hartley reported in Food in England that nettle beer was still being produced in the summer in country homes, as something with which to serve guests. Heysham, a coastal village in Lancashire, continued to sell nettle beer as of the 1990s.

== See also ==
- Ginger beer

== Sources ==
- Brears, Peter C D (1987). Traditional Food in Yorkshire. Edinburgh & Atlantic Highlands, NJ, USA: J. Donald Publishers. ISBN 0-85976-169-X.
- Burnett, John (2004). England Eats Out: A Social History of Eating Out in England from 1830 to the Present. Harlow, England & New York, London: Pearson/Longman. ISBN 0-582-47266-0.
- Caruso, Giuseppe (2022). The Botany of Beer: An Illustrated Guide to More than 500 Plants Used in Brewing. New York City: Columbia University Press. ISBN 978-0-231-20158-2.
- Hagen, Ann (2006). Anglo-Saxon Food and Drink: Production, Processing, Distribution and Consumption. Hockwold cum Wilton, Norfolk, England: Anglo-Saxon Books. ISBN 1-898281-41-6.
- Hartley, Dorothy (1999) [1954]. Food in England. London: Hachette Children's Group. ISBN 0-316-87900-2.
- Hughes, Glyn (2017). The Lost Foods of England. Winster, Derbyshire: Lulu Press. ISBN 978-0-244-02963-0.
- Hunwick, Heather Delancey (2018). The Sydney: A Food Biography. Rowman & Littlefield Publishers. ISBN 978-1-4422-5203-5.
- Levin, Judith (2021). Soda and Fizzy Drinks: A Global History. London: Reaktion Books. ISBN 978-1-78914-490-1.
- Randall, Colin (2003). "Urtica: Therapeutic and Nutritional Aspects of Stinging Nettles". In Kavalali, Gulsel M (ed.). Urtica: The genus Urtica. New York and London: Taylor and Francis. ISBN 0-203-01792-7.
- Singley, Blake (2012). "'Hardly Anything Fit for Man to eat': Food and Colonialism in Australia". History Australia. 9 (3): 27–42. doi:10.1080/14490854.2012.11668429.
- Vickery, Roy (1992). "Nettles: Their Uses and Folklore in the British Isles". Folk Life: Journal of Ethnological Studies. 31 (1). doi:10.1179/flk.1992.31.1.88.
- Vickery, Roy (2022). "Plants in Culture". In Giesecke, Annette; Mabberley, D J; Touwaide, Alain; Dalby, Andrew; Milam, Jennifer Dawn; Forbes, Stephen (eds.). A Cultural History of Plants. London, UK, New York and Dublin, Ireland: Bloomsbury Academic. ISBN 978-1-350-25935-5.
