= St Mary's Church, Marshwood =

Church in Dorset, England

St Mary's Church
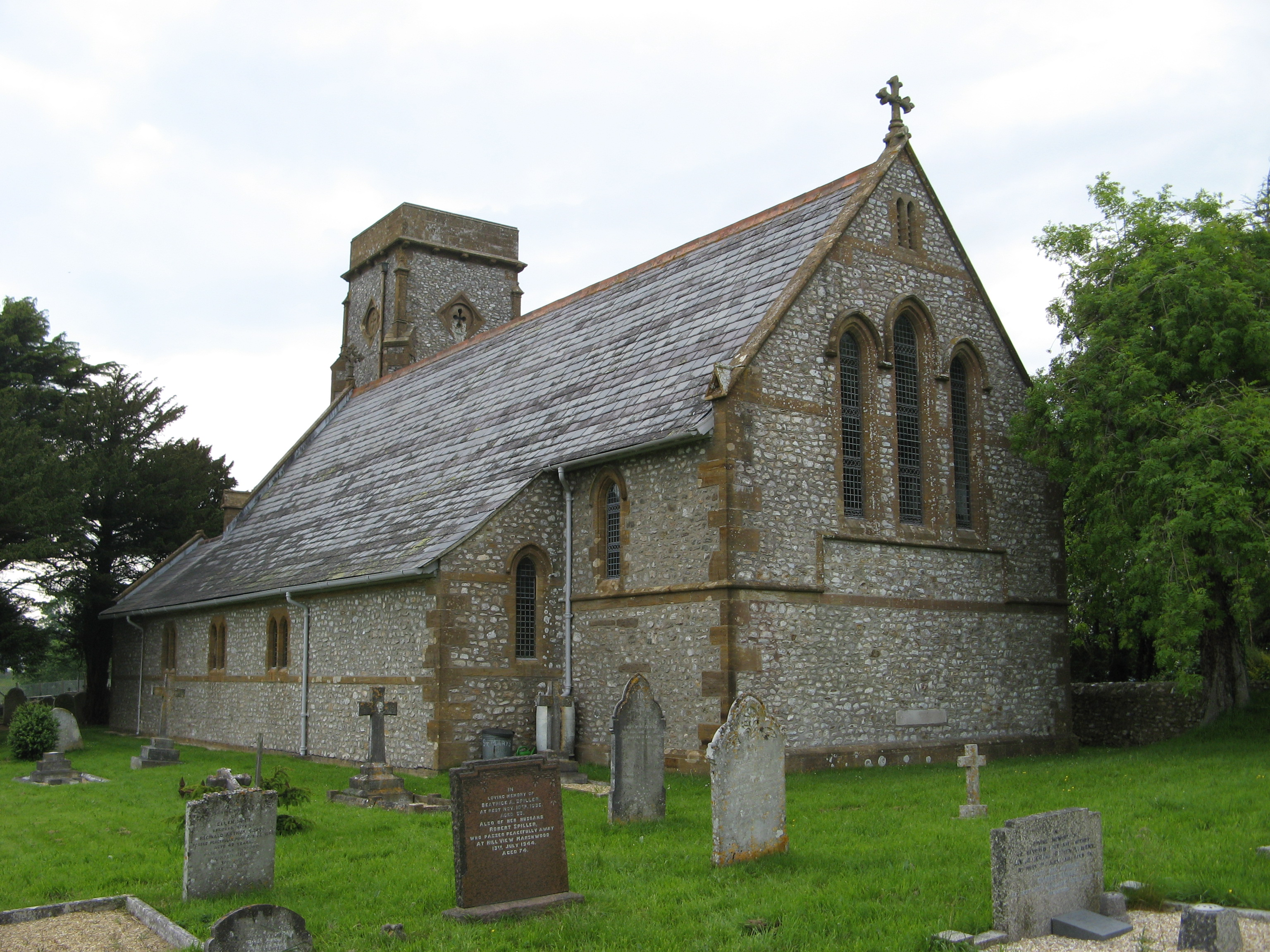
- St Mary's Church

Religion
- Affiliation: Church of England
- Ecclesiastical or organizational status: Active
- Year consecrated: 1841

Location
- Location: Marshwood, Dorset, England
- Interactive map of St Mary's Church
- Coordinates: 50.7927°N 2.8772°W

Architecture
- Type: Church

St Mary's Church is a Church of England church in Marshwood, Dorset, England. The earliest part of the church is the tower, which dates to 1840, while the rest of the building dates to a rebuild of 1883–84. St Mary's has been a Grade II listed building since 1983.

== History ==
Marshwood was originally served by a chapel dedicated to St Mary, which was located on the edge of Marshwood Castle. It had Norman origins and became a ruin in the 17th century. Plans for a replacement to serve the village did not come to fruition until the 19th century when fundraising began in the 1830s. The site for a new church was donated by Mr. C. B. Tucker of Chard in 1839 and Mr. Jesse Cornick of Bridport was awarded the contract for its construction in January 1840.

The foundation stone was laid at a ceremony on 25 March 1840, which was witnessed by approximately 2,000 people. The main body of the church and tower was completed by the end of November. St Mary's was consecrated on 26 October 1841 by the Bishop of Norwich, Edward Stanley, acting on behalf of the Bishop of Salisbury who was absent due to bereavement. Once the church was completed, attention turned to fundraising for a national school to be built in the village, which was erected in 1842 on land again donated by Mr. Tucker.

By the 1880s, the church had fallen into a state of disrepair and required immediate restoration, with fundraising led by Rev. William Toms. In 1883, plans drawn up by the architect Mr. G. Viles of London were accepted and the church, except for its tower, was rebuilt by Messrs Randall of Lyme Regis for a cost of £900. The church reopened with a ceremony on 15 May 1884.

In 2000, St Mary's Church and the adjacent primary school formed a partnership, allowing the school use of the church as a classroom and hall. Improvements to the church were carried out for the benefit of the school and congregation, including new seating and flooring. The church was then rededicated by the Bishop of Salisbury, David Stancliffe, on 3 October 2002. A new vestry was completed in 2007, allowing the original one to be used by the school as storage space.

== Notable burials ==
- Peter De Greef (1922-1980), film actor resident in the village
