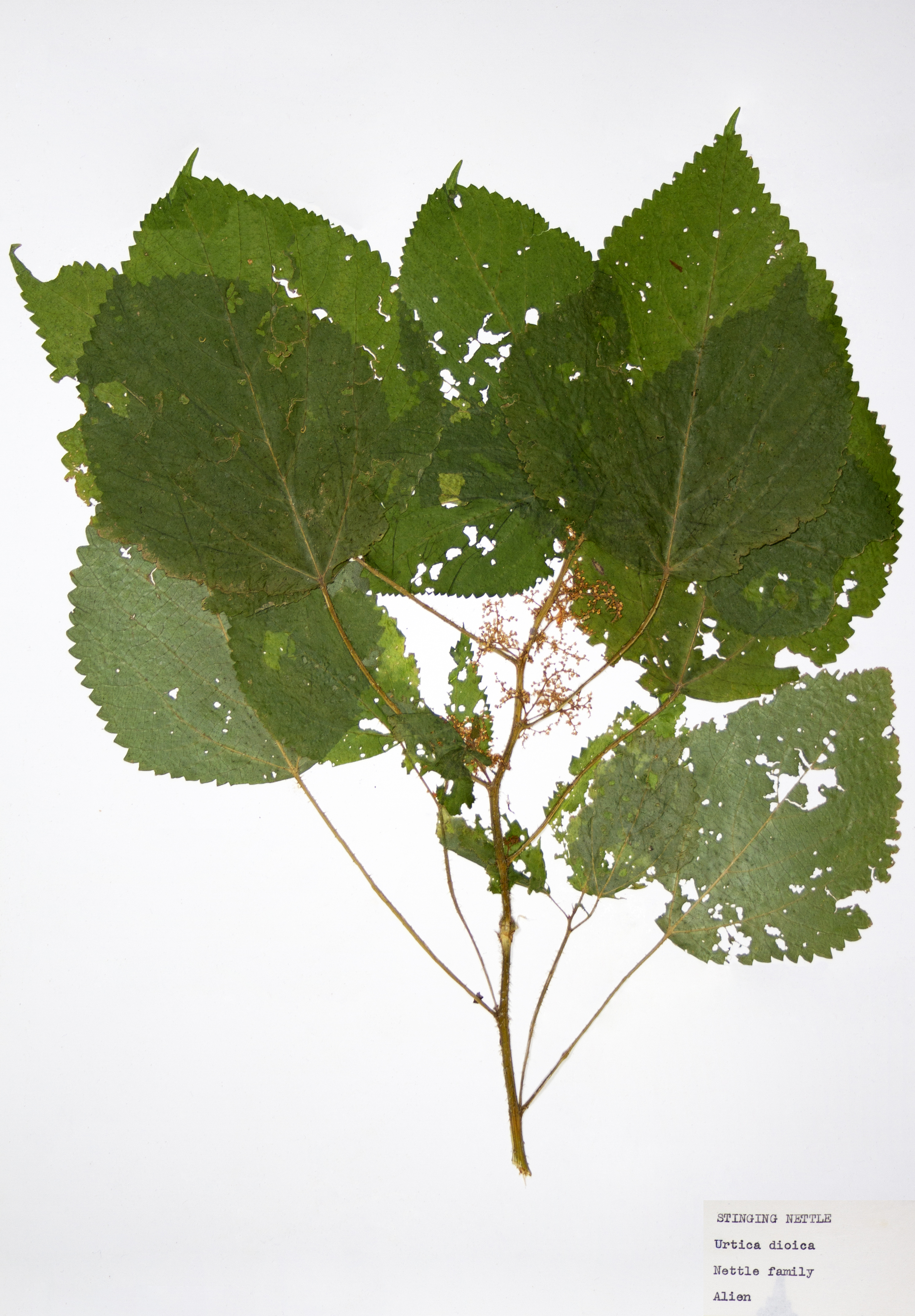

Scientific classification
- Kingdom: Plantae
- Clade: Tracheophytes
- Clade: Angiosperms
- Clade: Eudicots
- Clade: Rosids
- Order: Rosales
- Family: Urticaceae
- Genus: Urtica
- Species: U. dioica L.
- Subspecies: U. d. subsp. dioica

Trinomial name
- Urtica dioica subsp. dioica

= Urtica dioica subsp. dioica =

Subspecies of plant

Urtica dioica subsp. dioica is a subspecies of Urtica dioica.

== Description ==
Urtica dioica subsp. dioica grows from 0.6 to 2 meters and covered in stinging hairs. Leaves are dark green, coarse, opposite and 7.5 to 15 centimeters long.

== Habitat ==
Urtica dioica subsp. dioica grows in alluvial woods, woodlands, fence rows and waste places.
