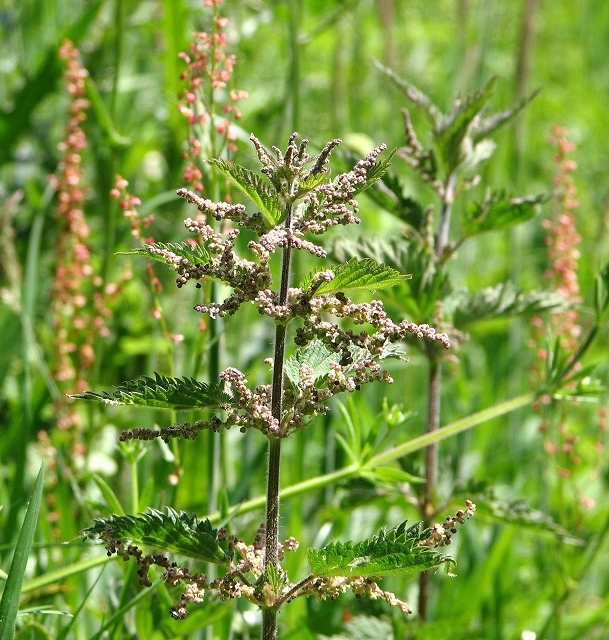
- Urtica dioica subsp. galeopsifolia

Conservation status
- Least Concern (IUCN 3.1)

Scientific classification
- Kingdom: Plantae
- Clade: Tracheophytes
- Clade: Angiosperms
- Clade: Eudicots
- Clade: Rosids
- Order: Rosales
- Family: Urticaceae
- Genus: Urtica
- Species: U. dioica

Binomial name
- Urtica dioica L.

= Urtica dioica =

Species of flowering plant

Urtica dioica, often known as common nettle, burn nettle, stinging nettle, nettle leaf, or just a nettle or stinger, is a herbaceous perennial flowering plant in the family Urticaceae. Originally native to Europe, much of temperate Asia and western North Africa, it is now found worldwide.

The species is divided into six subspecies, five of which have many hollow stinging hairs called trichomes on the leaves and stems, which act like hypodermic needles, injecting histamine and other chemicals that produce a stinging sensation upon contact ("contact urticaria", a form of contact dermatitis).

The plant has a long history of use as a source for traditional medicine, food, tea, and textile raw material in ancient (such as Saxon) and modern societies.

== Description ==
Urtica dioica is a dioecious, herbaceous, and perennial plant. It grows to 0.9 to 2 metres (3 to 7 feet) tall in the summer and dying down to the ground in winter. It has widely spreading rhizomes and stolons, which are bright yellow, as are the roots. The soft, green leaves are around 8 cm long, ranging from 3 to 20 cm (1 to 6 in), appearing in opposite pairs. The leaves have a strongly serrated margin, a cordate base, and an acuminate tip with a terminal leaf tooth longer than adjacent laterals. It bears small, greenish or brownish, numerous flowers in dense axillary inflorescences.

The leaves and stems are very hairy with non-stinging hairs, and in most subspecies, also bear many stinging hairs (trichomes or spicules), whose tips come off when touched, transforming the hair into a needle that can inject several chemicals causing a painful sting or paresthesia, giving the species its common names: stinging nettle, burn-nettle, burn-weed, or burn-hazel.

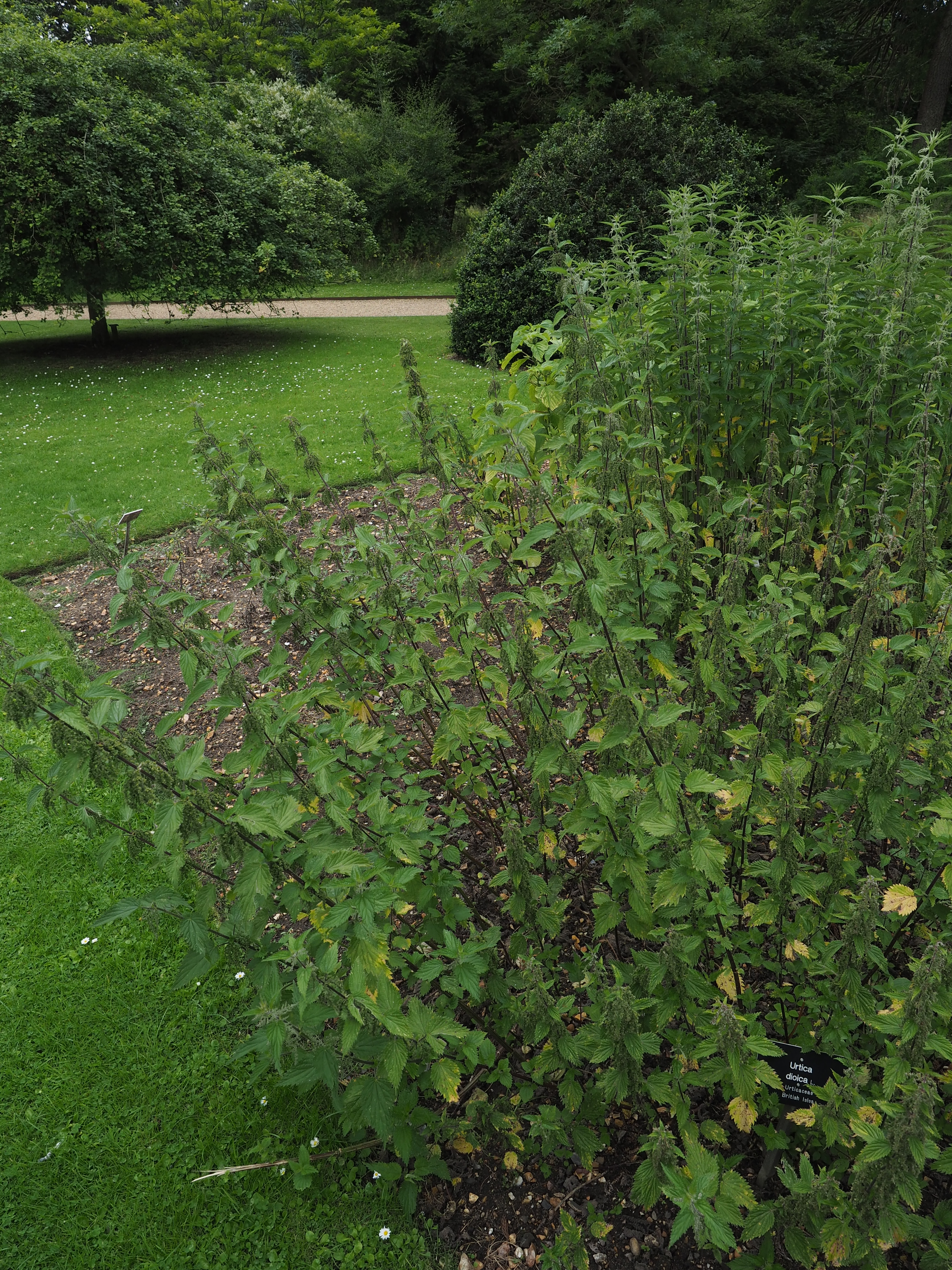
Cambridge specimen

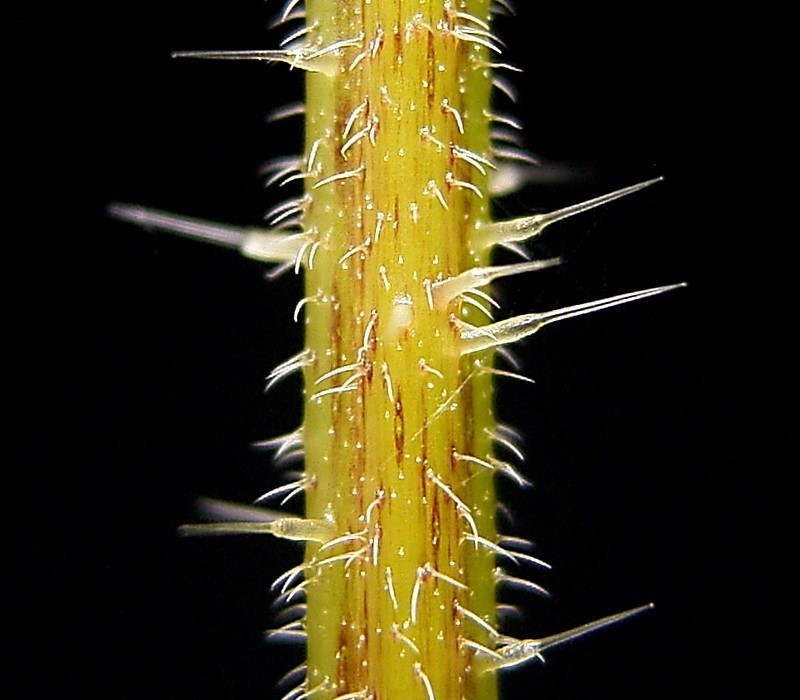
Close-up of the defensive hairs

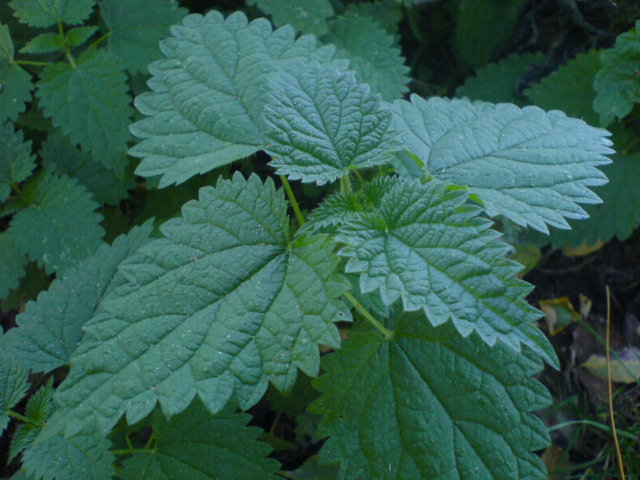
Young shoot leaves

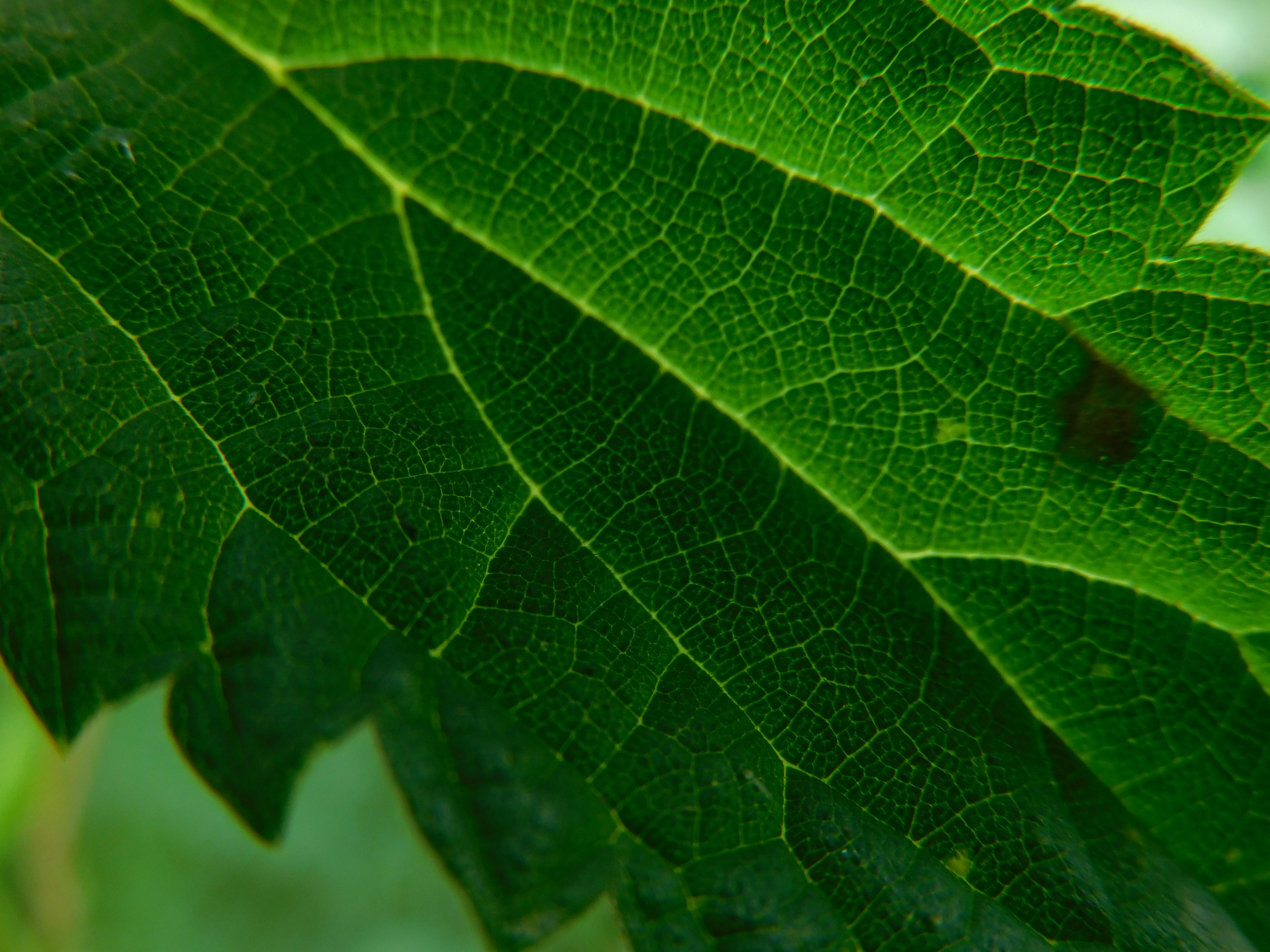
Leaf detail

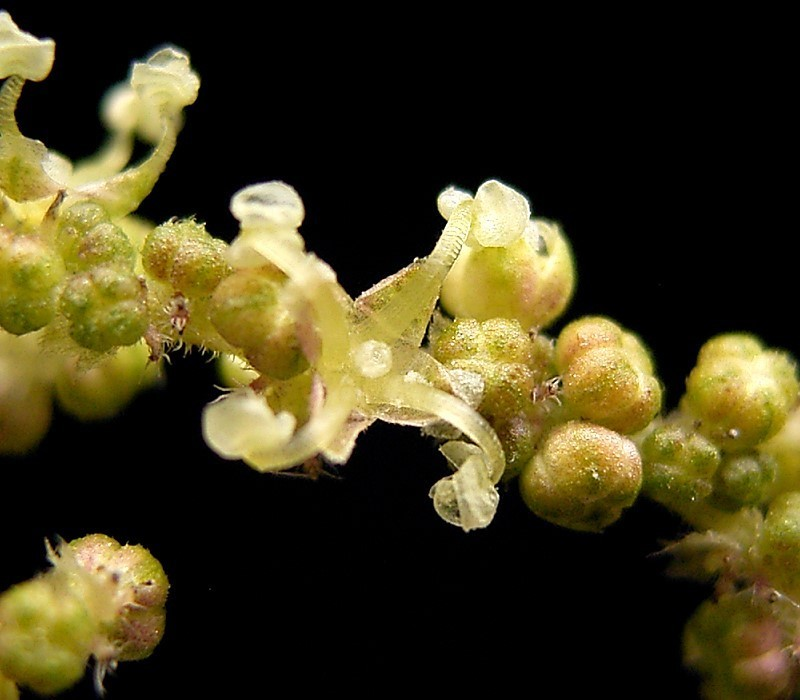
Flowers (male) can be yellow

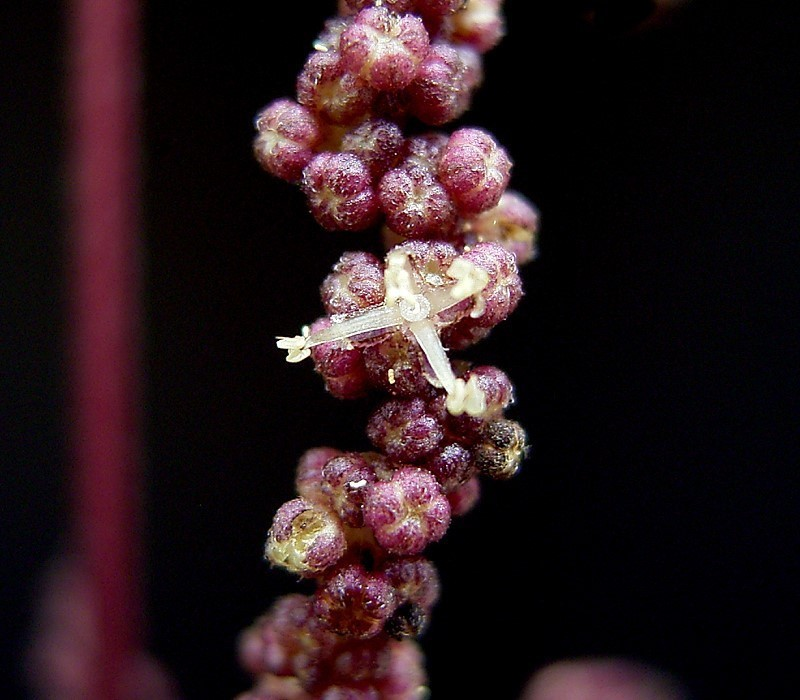
Flowers (male) can be purple.

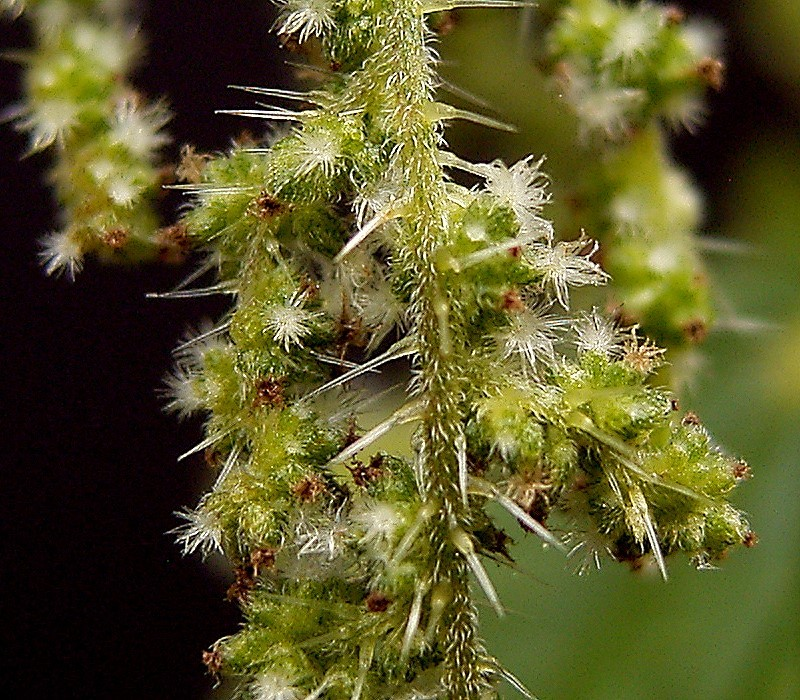
Flowers (female) can be green and white.

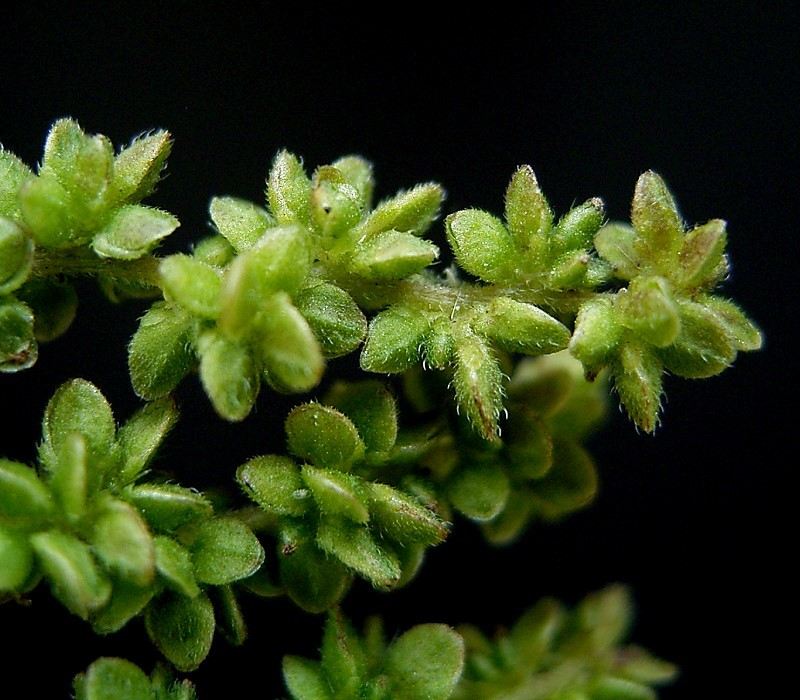
Fruits

Pollen

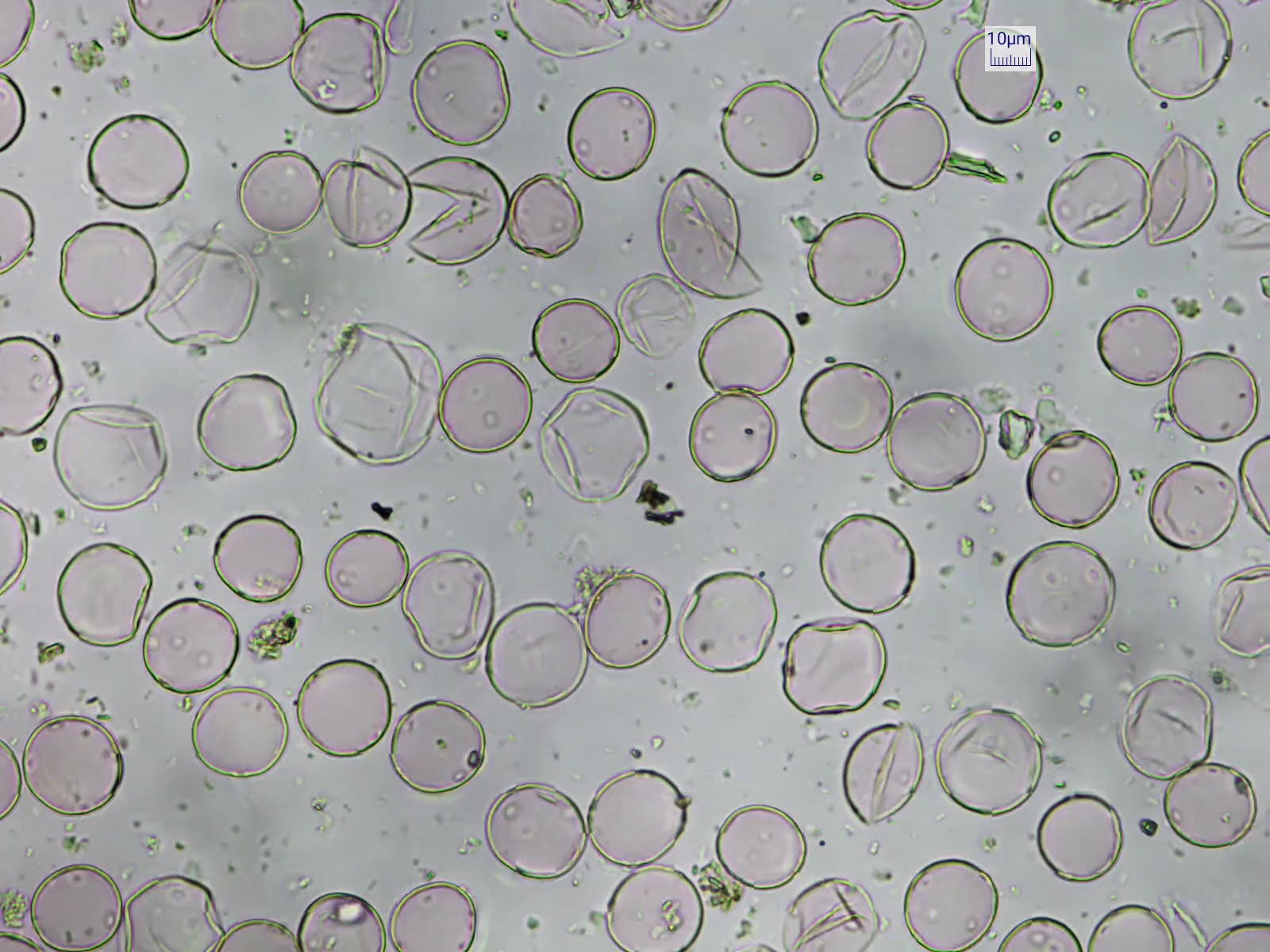
Processed pollen, 40x

== Taxonomy ==
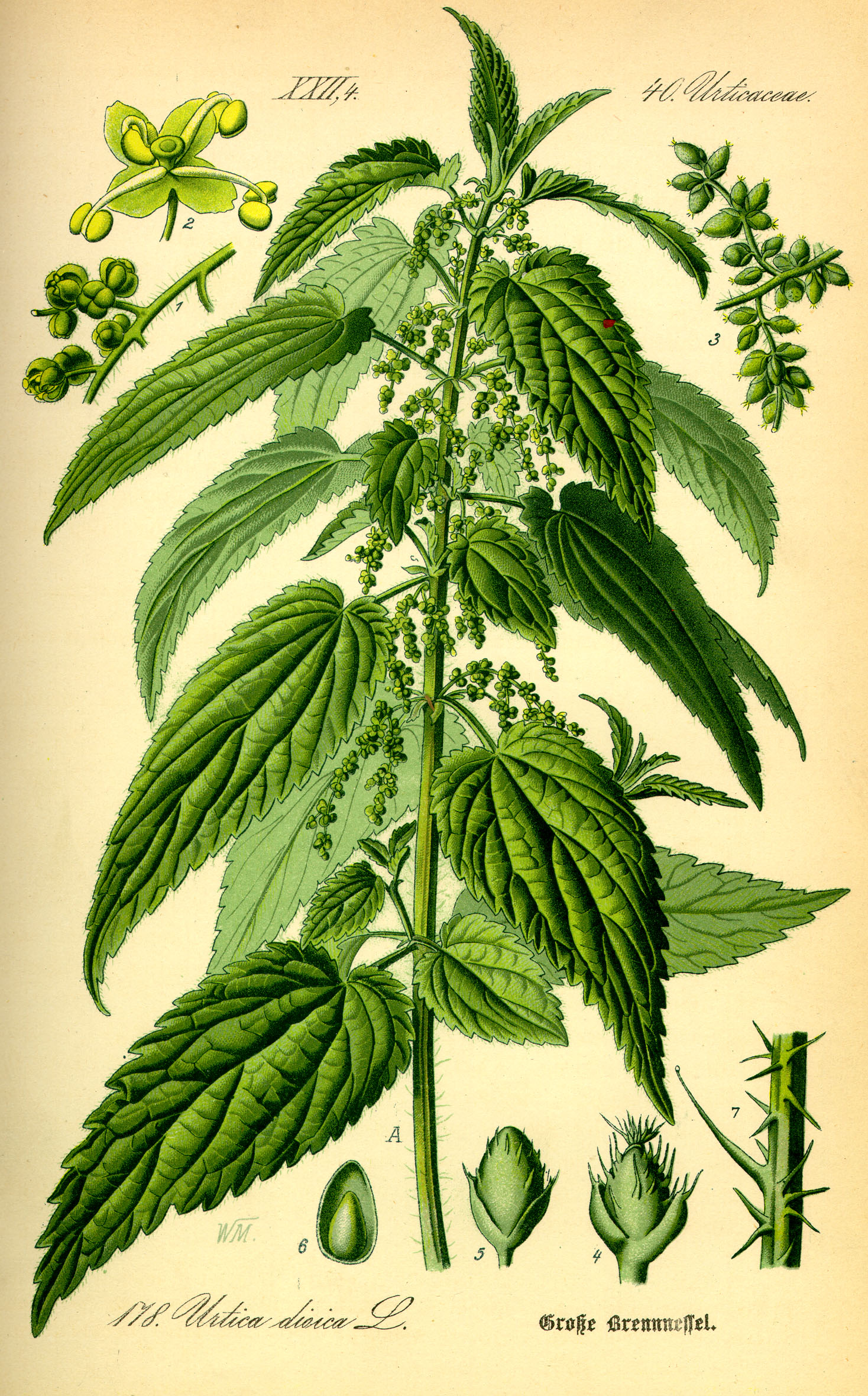
Illustration by Otto Wilhelm Thomé (1885)

Credit for the scientific naming of Urtica dioica is given to Carl Linnaeus, who published it in Species Plantarum in 1753. The taxonomy of Urtica species is confused, and sources are likely to use a variety of systematic names for these plants. Until 2014 there was broad consensus that the nettles native to the Americas, now classified as Urtica gracilis, were subspecies of U. dioica. However, in that year the paper "Weeding the Nettles II" was published in the journal Phytotaxa demonstrating the genetic distinctness of New World nettles. As of 2023 Plants of the World Online (POWO) recognises U. gracilis as a distinct species while the USDA Natural Resources Conservation Service PLANTS database continues to list it as U. dioica subsp. gracilis, as does the Flora of North America.

As of 2023 POWO recognises 11 subspecies or varieties of U. dioica:

- Urtica dioica subsp. afghanica Chrtek, from southwestern and central Asia, sometimes has stinging hairs or is sometimes hairless.
- Urtica dioica subsp. dioica (European stinging nettle), from Europe, Asia, and northern Africa, has stinging hairs.
- Urtica dioica subsp. gansuensis C.J.Chen, from eastern Asia (China), has stinging hairs.
- Urtica dioica var. glabrata (Clem.) Asch. & Graebn.
- Urtica dioica var. hispida (Lam. ex DC.) Tausch ex Ott
- Urtica dioica var. holosericea Fr., in many sources as Urtica angustifolia.
- Urtica dioica subsp. kurdistanica Chrtek
- Urtica dioica subsp. pubescens (Ledeb.) Domin, in many sources as U. dioica subsp. galeopsifolia (fen nettle or stingless nettle), from Europe, does not have stinging hairs.
- Urtica dioica var. sarmatica Zapał.
- Urtica dioica subsp. sondenii (Simmons) Hyl.
- Urtica dioica subsp. subinermis (R.Uechtr.) Weigend

=== Etymology ===
Urtica is derived from a Latin word meaning 'sting'.

Dioica (δίοικος) is derived from Greek, meaning 'of two houses' (having separate staminate and pistillate plants; dioecious).

The English name nettle is derived from Proto-Germanic *natilǭ, from *natǭ (nettle) with the instrumental suffix *-ilǭ. *natǭ might be related to the word "net" as the fibers were twisted and used for net-making.

== Distribution and habitat ==
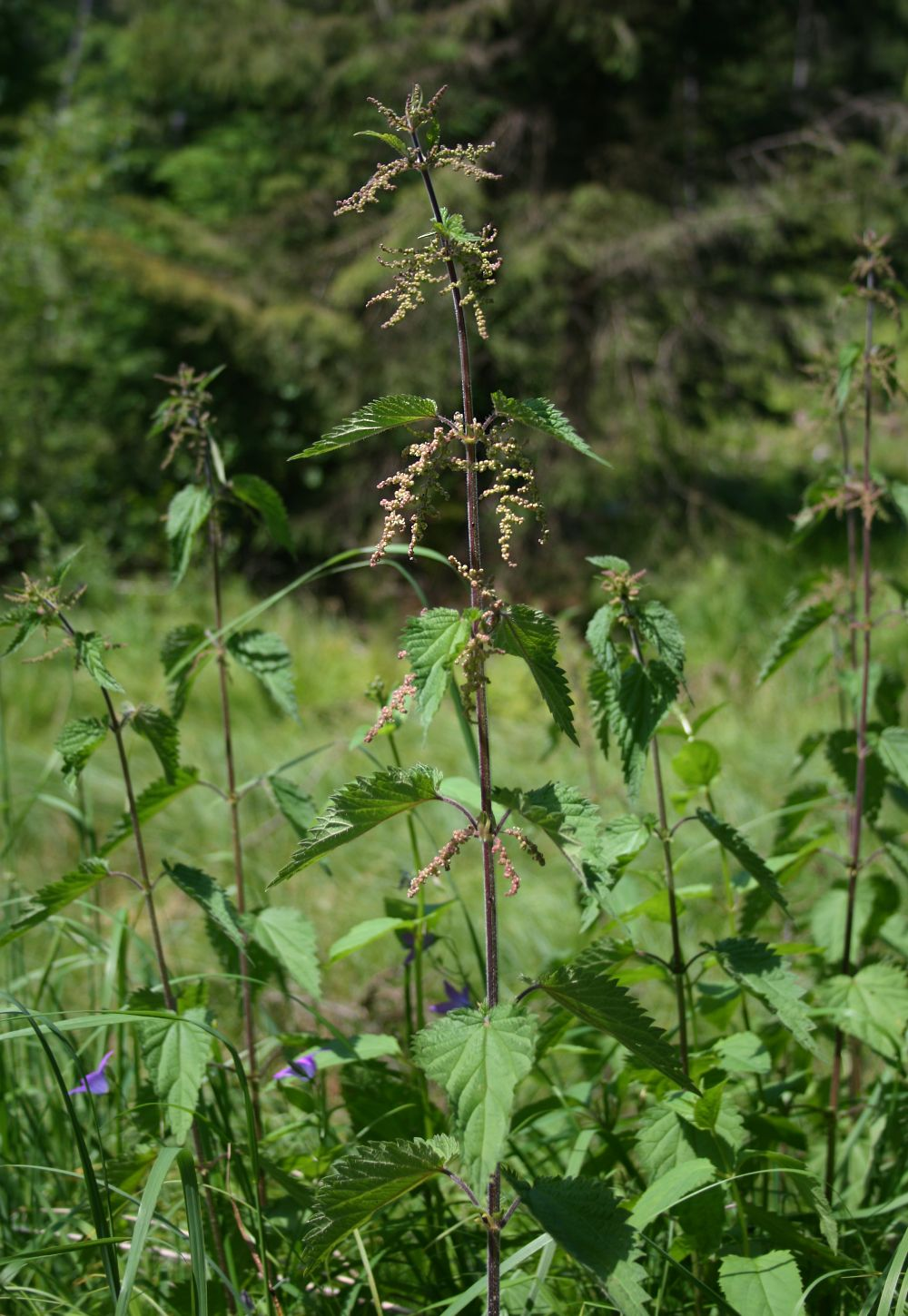
A stinging nettle growing in a field

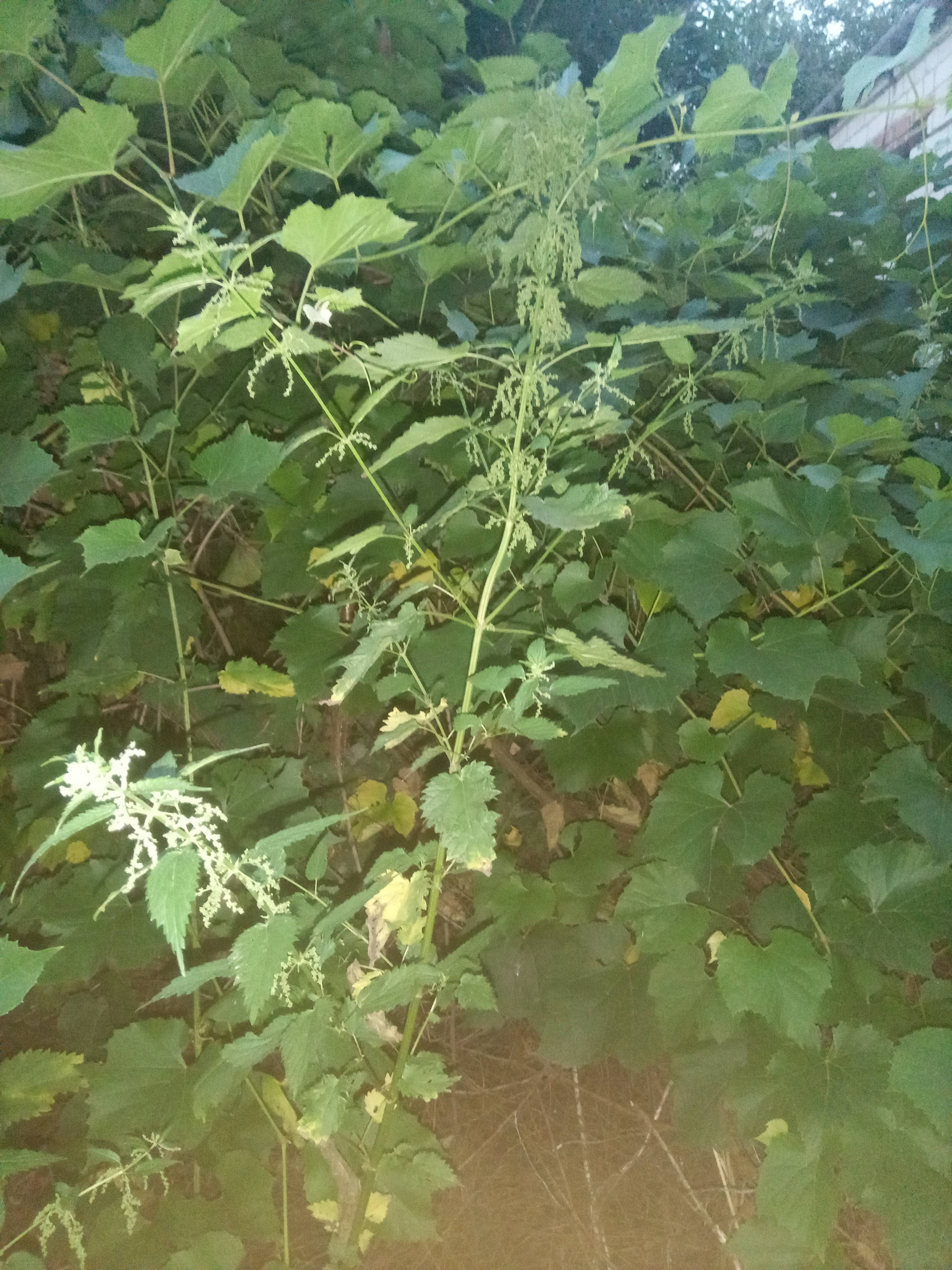
Common nettle in July. Axillary shoots are visible.

U. dioica is considered to be native to Europe, much of temperate Asia and western North Africa. It is found commonly on disturbed soil or by river banks. It has been introduced to many other parts of the world. In North America, it is widely distributed in Canada and the United States, where it is found in every province and state except for Hawaii, and also can be found in northernmost Mexico. It grows in abundance in the Pacific Northwest, especially in places where annual rainfall is high. The European subspecies has been introduced into Australia, North America and South America.

In Europe, nettles have a strong association with human habitation and buildings. The presence of nettles may indicate the site of a long-abandoned building, and can also indicate soil fertility. Human and animal waste may be responsible for elevated levels of phosphate and nitrogen in the soil, providing an ideal environment for nettles.

== Ecology ==
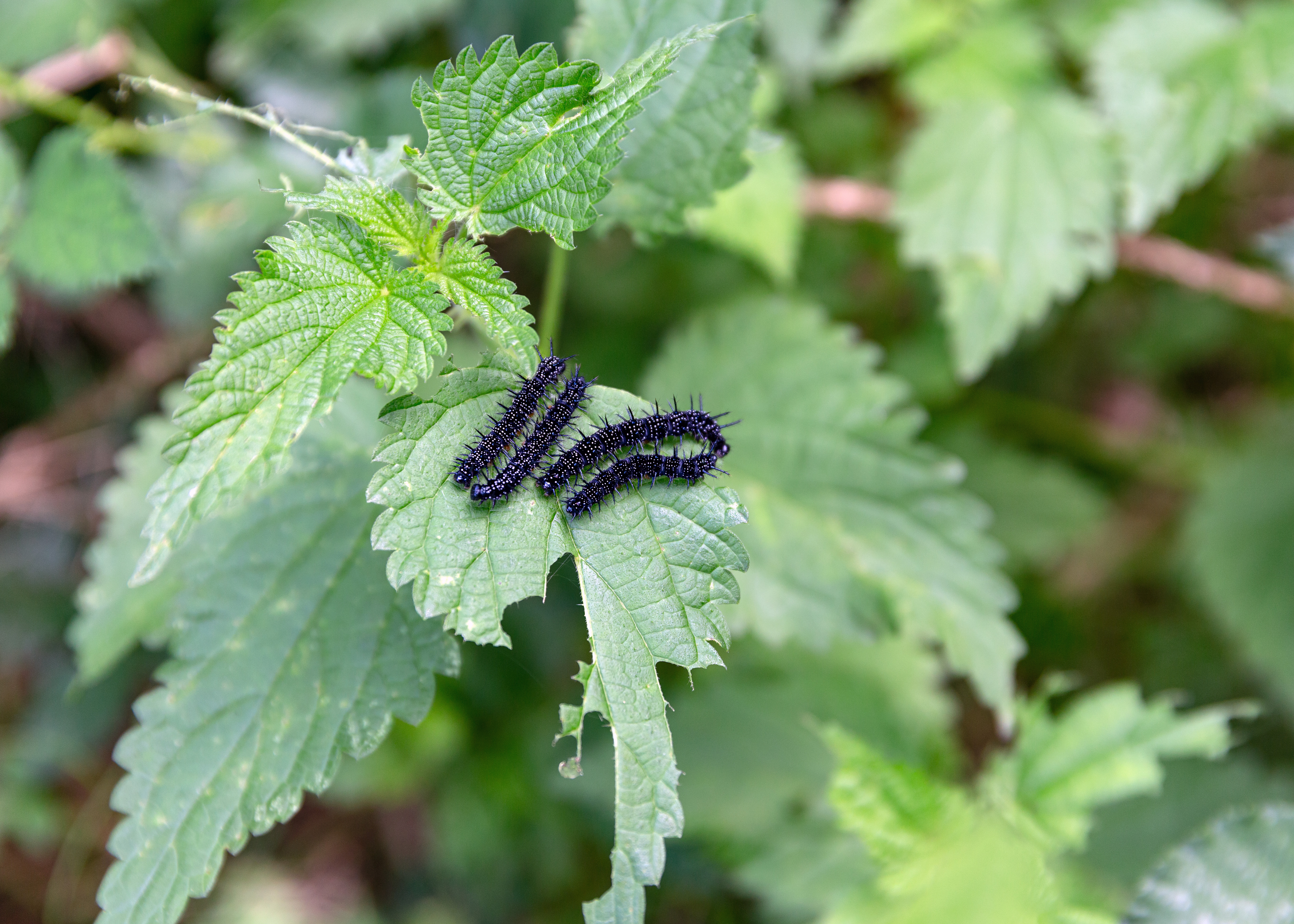
Aglais io caterpillars feeding on leaves

Nettles are the larval food plant for several species of butterflies in the Nymphalidae family, such as the peacock butterfly, comma (Polygonia c-album), and the small tortoiseshell. It is also eaten by the larvae of some moths including angle shades, buff ermine, dot moth, the flame, the gothic, grey chi, grey pug, lesser broad-bordered yellow underwing, mouse moth, setaceous Hebrew character, and small angle shades. The roots are sometimes eaten by the larva of the ghost moth (Hepialus humuli).

It is a known host to the pathogenic fungus Phoma herbarum.

Stinging nettle is particularly found as an understory plant in wetter environments, but it is also found in meadows. Although nutritious, it is not widely eaten by either wildlife or livestock, presumably because of the sting. It spreads by abundant seeds and also by rhizomes, and is often able to survive and re-establish quickly after fire.

== Relationship to humans ==
=== Cultivation ===
==== Sowing and planting ====
Three cultivation techniques can be used for the stinging nettle: 1) direct sowing, 2) growing seedlings in nurseries with subsequent transplantation and 3) vegetative propagation via stolons or head cuttings.

1. Direct sowing: The seedbed should have a loose and fine structure, but should be reconsolidated using a packer roller imminently prior to sowing. Sowing time can be either in autumn or in spring. Seed density should be 6 kilograms/hectare with row spacing of 30 cm (12 in) and 42–50 cm in autumn and spring, respectively. The disadvantage of direct sowing is that it usually leads to incomplete plant coverage. This drawback can be mitigated by covering the seedbed with a transparent perforated foil in order to improve seed germination. Further, weed control can be problematic as the stinging nettle has a slow seedling development time.
2. Growing seedlings: For this technique pre-germinated seeds are sown between mid-/end-February and beginning of April and grown in nurseries. Seedlings are grown in tuffs with 3–5 plants/tuff and a seed density of 1.2–1.6 kg/1000 tuffs. Faster germination is achieved by alternating high temperature during daytime (30 °C for 8 h) and lower temperature during nighttime (20 °C for 16 h). Before transplanting, the seedlings should be fertilised and acclimated to cold temperatures. Transplantation should start around Mid-April with row spacing of 42–50 cm (17–20 in) and plant spacing within rows of 25–30 cm.
3. Vegetative propagation: Stolons (with several buds) of 10 cm should be planted from mid-April in a depth of 5–7 cm (2–2 3/4 in). Head cuttings are grown in nurseries starting between mid-May and mid-June. Growing tips with two leaf pairs are cut from the mother plant and treated with root-growth inducing hormones. Transplantation can be delayed in comparison to the growing seedling technique.

==== Greenhouse ====
The stinging nettle can also be grown in controlled-environment agriculture systems, such as soil-less medium cultivations or aeroponics, which may achieve higher yields, standardise quality, and reduce harvesting costs and contamination.

=== Sting and treatment ===
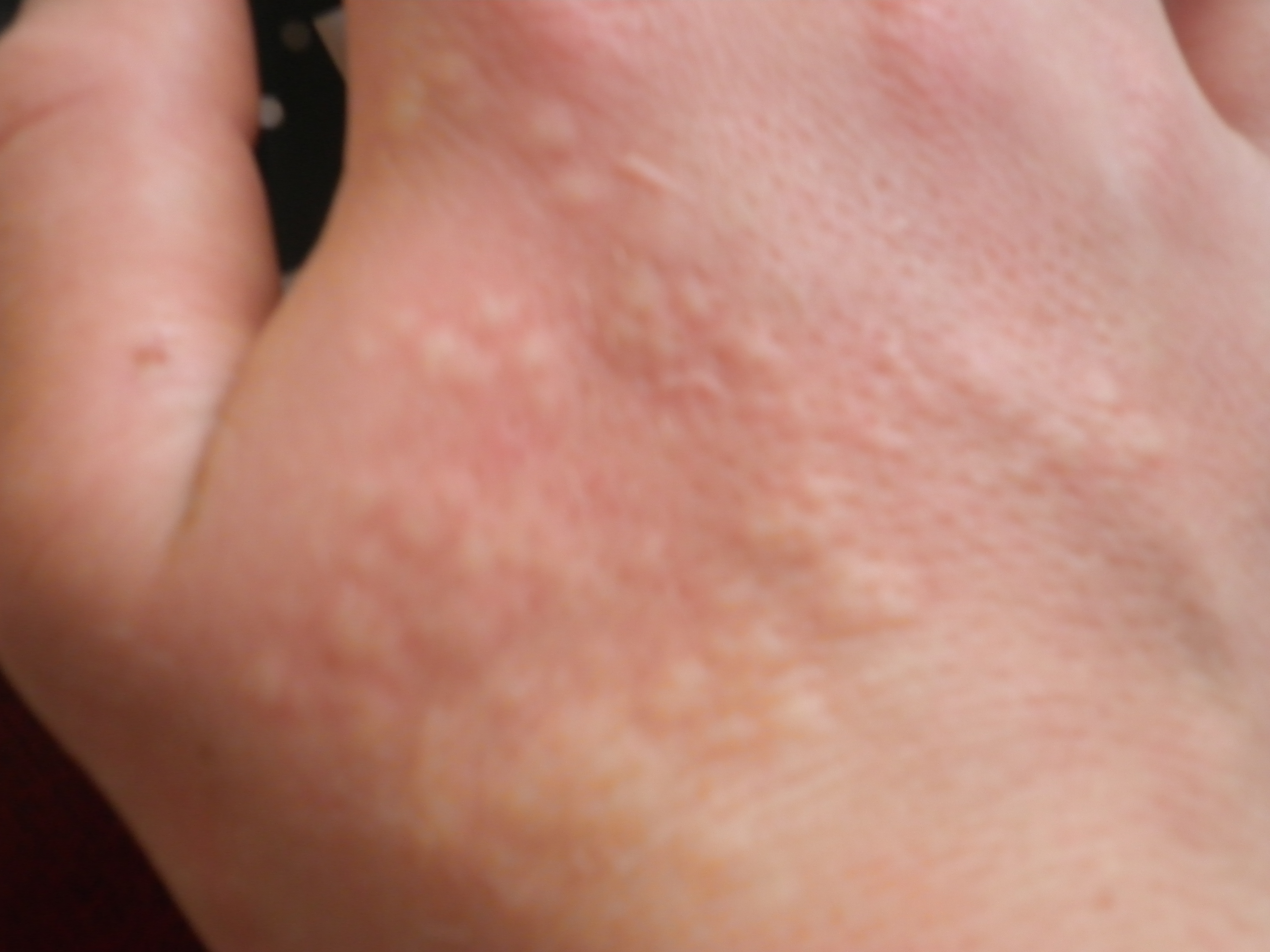
A hand with nettle dermatitis

Urtica dioica produces its inflammatory effect on skin (a stinging, burning sensation often called "contact urticaria") both by impaling the skin via spicules – causing mechanical irritation – and by biochemical irritants, such as histamine, serotonin, and acetylcholine, among other chemicals. In especially sensitive individuals, anti-itch drugs, usually in the form of creams containing antihistamines or hydrocortisone, may provide relief from nettle dermatitis, though the symptoms are essentially self-resolving and typically only last about 10 minutes. In some cases, durations of 12 hours or more have been observed. The term contact urticaria has a wider use in dermatology, involving dermatitis caused by various skin irritants and pathogens.

The best treatment immediately following a sting is generally considered to be washing the affected area with lukewarm water and soap, and avoid scratching.

Docks, especially Rumex obtusifolius (the broad-leaf dock) often grow in similar environments to stinging nettles and are regarded as a folk remedy to counteract the sting of a nettle, although there is no evidence of any chemical effect. It may be that the act of rubbing a dock leaf against a nettle sting acts as a distracting counterstimulation, or that belief in the dock's effect provides a placebo effect.

=== Food ===
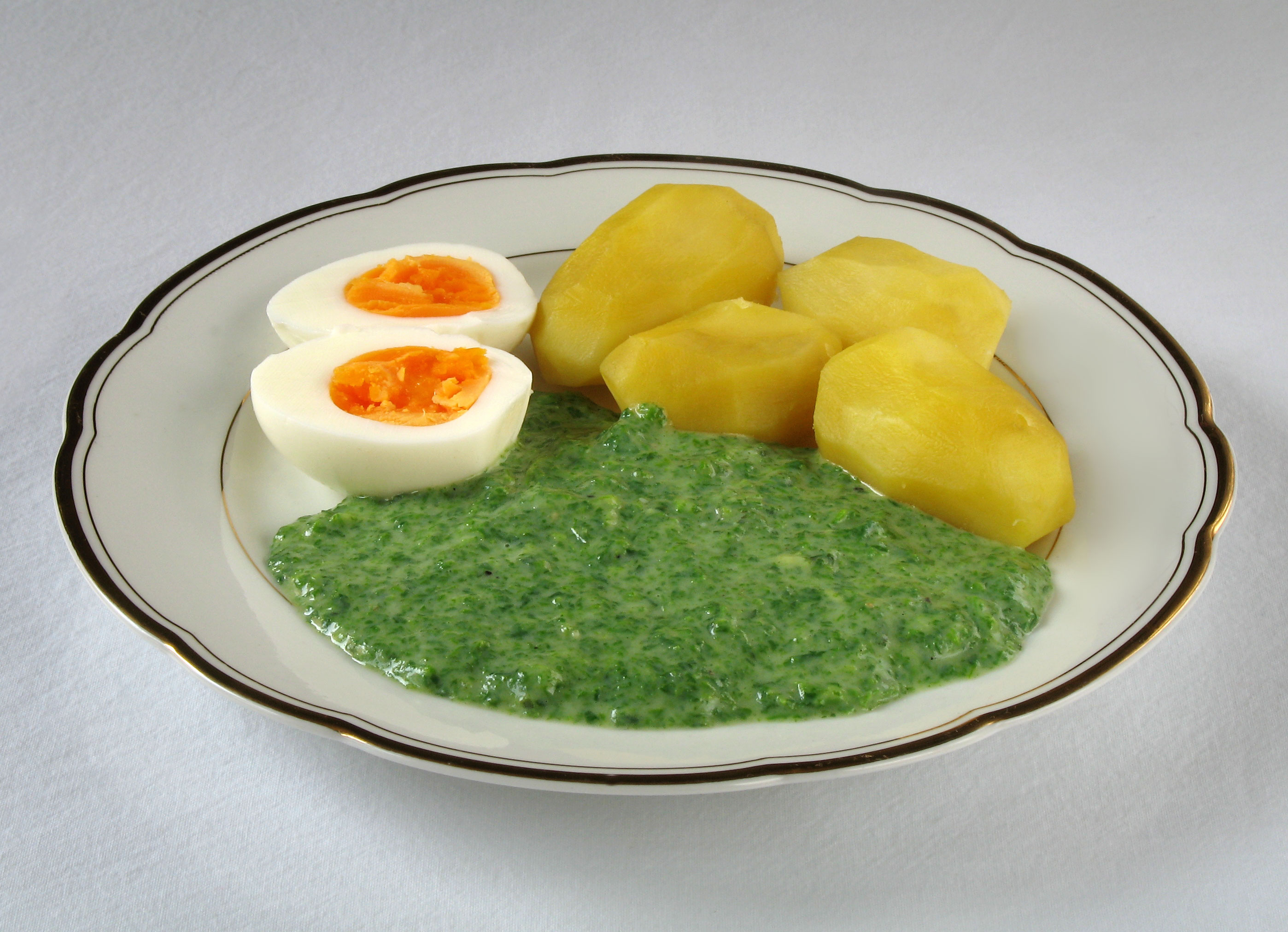
The young leaves are edible and can be used as a leaf vegetable, as with a purée.

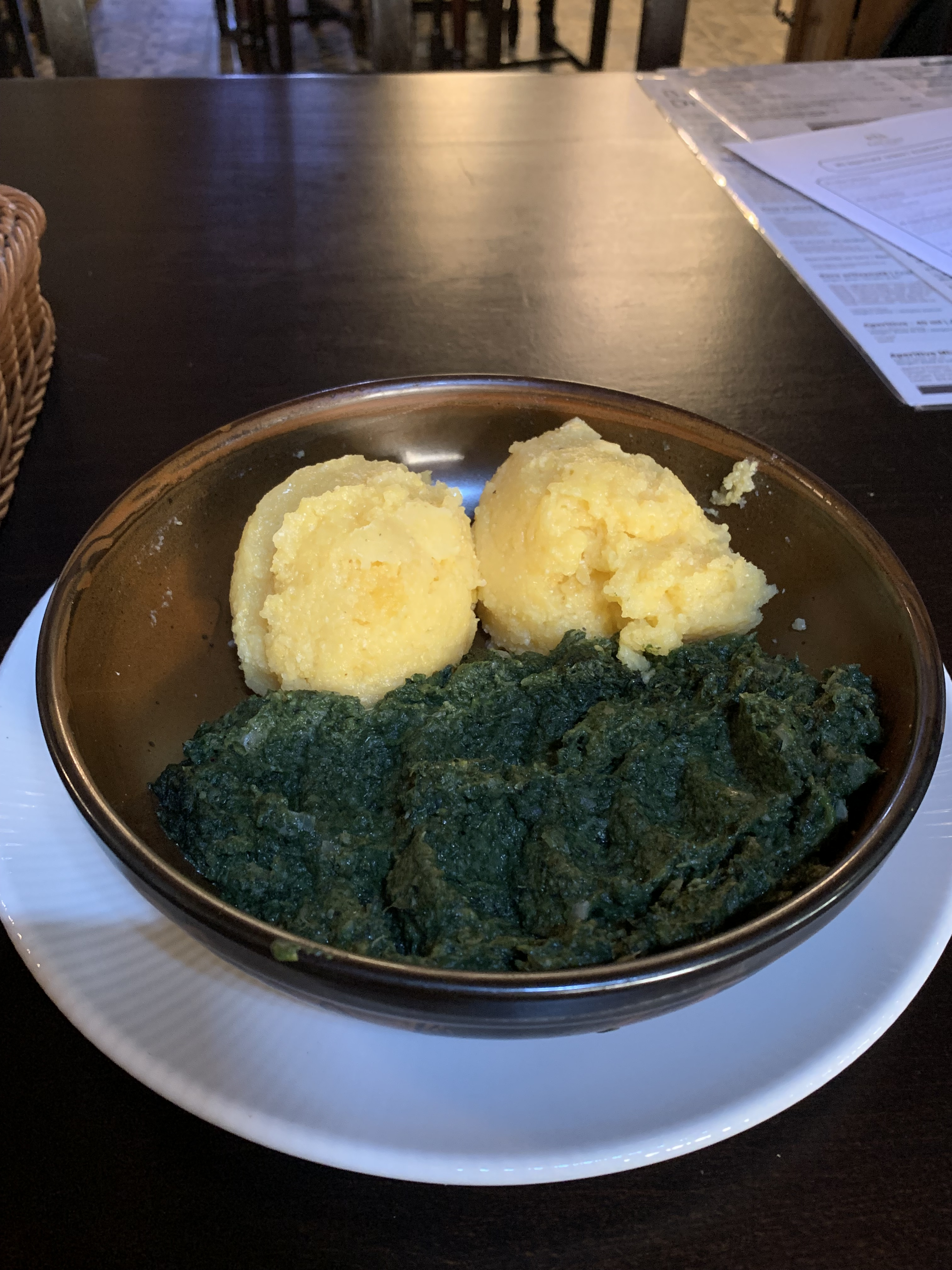
Mâncare de urzici, a Romanian stew made of the leaves, served with mămăligă

U. dioica has a flavour similar to spinach when cooked. Young plants are harvested by many Native American communities and are cooked and eaten in spring when other food plants are scarce. Soaking stinging nettles in water or cooking removes the stinging chemicals from the plant, which allows them to be handled and eaten without injury. After the stinging nettle enters its flowering and seed-setting stages, the leaves develop gritty particles called cystoliths. Many sources claim consumption of these can irritate the kidneys and urinary tract, but there is no medical evidence to support this claim. Cystoliths are made of calcium carbonate, and will not dissolve when boiled. Leaves harvested post-flowering must have their cystoliths broken down by acid, as in the fermentation process. In its peak season, nettle contains up to 25% protein, dry weight, which is high for a leafy green vegetable. The leaves are also dried and may then be used to make a herbal tea, as can also be done with the nettle's flowers.

Nettles can be used in a variety of recipes, such as polenta, pesto, and purée. Nettle soup is a common use of the plant, particularly in Northern and Eastern Europe.

Nettles are sometimes used in cheesemaking, such as for Cornish Yarg and as a flavouring in varieties of Gouda.

Nettles are used in Albania, Montenegro, Serbia, North Macedonia and Bosnia and Herzegovina as part of the dough filling for the börek pastry. The top baby leaves are selected and simmered, and then mixed with other ingredients such as herbs and rice, before being used as a filling between dough layers. Similarly, in Greece the tender leaves are often used, after simmering, as a filling for hortopita, which is similar to spanakopita, but with wild greens rather than spinach for filling.

Young nettles can also be used to make nettle beer.

==== Competitive eating ====
In the United Kingdom, an annual World Nettle Eating Championship draws thousands of people to Dorset, where competitors attempt to eat as much of the raw plant as possible. Competitors are given 60 cm (24 in) stalks of the plant, from which they strip the leaves and eat them. Whoever strips and eats the most stinging nettle leaves in a fixed time is the winner. The competition dates back to 1986, when two neighbouring farmers attempted to settle a dispute about which had the worst infestation of nettles, and one of them said to the other, "I'll eat any nettle of yours that's longer than mine."

=== Traditional medicine ===
As Old English stiþe and wergulu, nettle is one of the nine plants invoked in the pagan Anglo-Saxon Nine Herbs Charm, recorded in 10th-century traditional medicine. Nettle was believed to be a galactagogue – a substance that promotes lactation. Urtication, or flogging with nettles, is the process of deliberately applying stinging nettles to the skin to provoke inflammation; an agent thus used was considered to be a rubefacient (something that causes redness), used as a folk remedy to supposedly treat rheumatism.

=== Chastisement ===
In indigenous justice systems in Ecuador, urtication was used as punishment for severe crimes in 2010. The sentenced perpetrator of a crime was flogged with stinging nettle, in public, naked, whilst being showered with freezing cold ice water.

=== Textiles and fibre ===
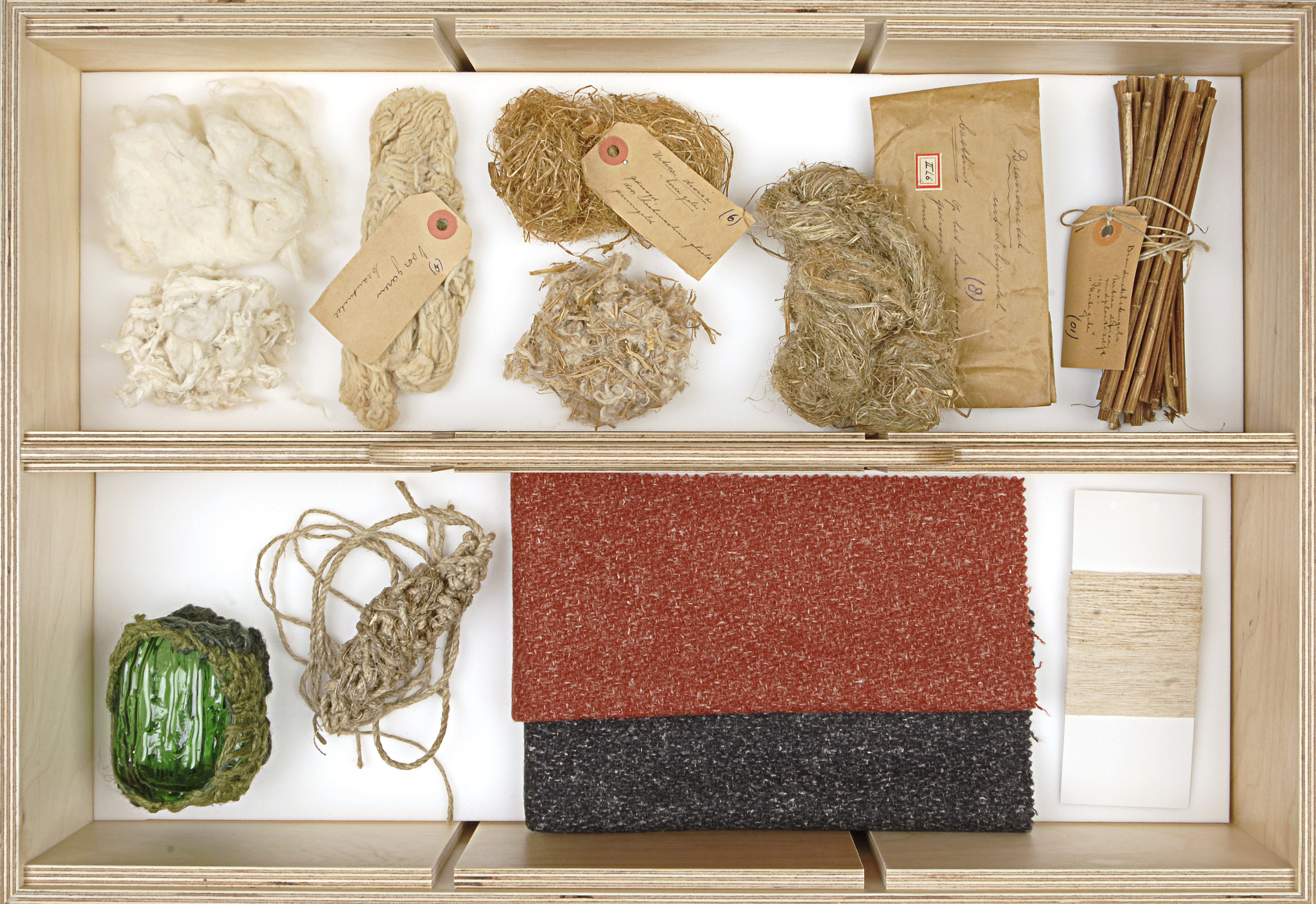
Nettle fibre, stem, yarn, textile, jewellery with glass and nettle yarn

Nettle stems contain a bast fibre that has been traditionally used for the same purposes as linen and is produced by a similar retting process. Unlike cotton, nettles grow easily without pesticides. The fibres are coarser, however.

Historically, nettles have been used to make clothing for almost 3,000 years, as ancient nettle textiles from the Bronze Age have been found in Denmark. It is widely believed that German Army uniforms were almost all made from nettle during World War I due to a shortage of cotton, although there is little evidence to support this. More recently, companies in Austria, Germany, and Italy have started to produce commercial nettle textiles.

The fibre content in nettle shows a high variability and reaches from below 1% to 17%. Under middle-European conditions, stems yield typically between 45 and 55 dt / ha (decitons per hectare), which is comparable to flax stem yield. Due to the variable fibre content, the fibre yields vary between 0.2 and 7 dt / ha, but the yields are normally in the range between 2 and 4 dt / ha. Fibre varieties are normally cloning varieties and therefore planted from vegetative propagated plantlets. Direct seeding is possible, but leads to great heterogeneity in maturity.

Nettles may be used as a dye-stuff, producing yellow from the roots, or yellowish green from the leaves.

=== Animal Feed ===
==== Nutrient contents ====
Fresh leaves contain approximately 82.4% water, 17.6% dry matter, 5.5% protein, 0.7 to 3.3% fat, and 7.1% carbohydrates. Mature leaves contain about 40% α- linolenic acid, a valuable omega-3 acid. For exact fatty acid contents see Table 1. Seeds contain much more fatty acid than leaves.

Table 1: Fatty acid content of different plant organs of U. dioica. Standard deviations are given in brackets.
		Mature leaves	Young leaves	Seeds	Stems	Roots
Moisture (% fresh weight)		72.8 (± 5.1)	82.0 (± 3.7)	47.6 (± 2.1)	50.1 (± 2.4)	40.3 (± 2.8)
Saponifiable oil (% fresh weight)		2.1 (± 0.3)	3.3 (± 0.2)	15.1 (± 2.0)	1.5 (± 0.1)	0.1 (± 0.0)
Fatty acids (% of saponifiable oil)
Palmitic	16:0	17.9 (± 1.1)	20.1 (± 0.9)	25.4 (± 1.9)	23.6 (± 2.1)	24.0 (± 0.8)
Palmitoleic	16:1n-7	3.0 (± 0.2)	3.9 (± 0.3)	0.7 (± 0.0)	0.5 (± 0.0)	2.6 (± 0.3)
Stearic	18:0	1.6 (± 0.3)	1.9 (± 0.1)	2.3 (± 0.3)	1.8 (± 0.2)	1.6 (± 0.1)
Oleic	18:1n-9	1.7 (± 0.2)	2.8 (± 0.2)	4.8 (± 0.3)	2.1 (± 0.2)	8.7 (± 0.5)
Linoleic	18:2n-6	11.6 (± 1.0)	18.1 (± 1.3)	22.7 (± 1.9)	33.8 (± 2.9)	34.3 (± 2.7)
α- Linolenic	18:3n-3	40.7 (± 3.2)	29.6 (± 2.1)	6.6 (± 4.9)	12.2 (± 1.0)	2.3 (± 0.1)
Gadoleic	20:1n-9	0.8 (± 0.0)	0.7 (± 0.0)	2.1 (± 0.2)	1.5 (± 0.1)	1.2 (± 0.0)
Erucic	22:1n-9	0.4 (± 0.0)	0.5 (± 0.1)	1.2 (± 0.2)	0.9 (± 0.2)	0.9 (± 0.1)
Omega-3 : Omega-6 Ratio	n-3/n-6	3.51	1.64	0.29	0.65	0.07

Minerals (Ca, K, Mg, P, Si, S, Cl) and trace elements (Ti, 80 ppm, Mn, Cu, Fe) contents depend mostly on the soil and the season.

Carotenoids can be found primarily in the leaves, where different forms of lutein, xanthophyll and carotene are present (Table 2). Some carotenes are precursors of vitamin A (retinol), their retinol equivalents RE or retinol activity equivalents per g dry weight are 1.33 for mature leaves and 0.9 for young leaves. Nettle contains much less carotenes and retinol than carrots, which contain 8.35 RE per g fresh weight. Depending on the batch and the leaf and stem content, nettle contains only traces of zeaxanthin or between 20–60 mg/kg of dry matter. Nettle contains ascorbic acid (vitamin C), riboflavin (vitamin B_{2}), pantothenic acid, vitamin K_{1} and tocopherols (vitamin E). The highest vitamin contents can be found in the leaves.

Table 2: Carotenoid concentration of leaves of U. dioica (μg/ g dry weight). Standard deviations are given in brackets.
		Mature leaves	Young leaves
Total identified carotenoids		74.8	51.4
Xanthophylls	Neoxanthin	5.0 (± 0.2)	2.6 (± 0.2) 0
	Violaxanthin	11.0 (± 0.2)	7.2 (± 0.6)
	Zeaxanthin	traces	traces
	β-cryptoxanthin	traces	traces
Luteins	13-cis-lutein	0.4 (± 0.0)	0.4 (± 0.0)
	13'-cis-lutein	8.4 (± 0.4)	5.0 (± 0.6)
	All-trans-lutein	32.4 (± 1.0)	23.6 (± 0.8)
	9-cis-lutein	1.2 (± 0.2)	1.0 (± 0.2)
	9'-cis-lutein	4.4 (± 0.4)	3.4 (± 0.6)
Carotenes	All-trans-β-carotene	5.6 (± 0.7)	3.8 (± 0.3)
	β-carotene-cis-isomers	4.8 (± 0.2)	3.2 (± 0.2)
	Lycopene	1.6 (± 0.1)	1.2 (± 0.1)
Retinol equivalent	RE / g dry wt	1.33 (± 0.3)	0.90 (± 0.3)

==== Poultry: Egg yolk colouring in laying hens ====
In laying hens, nettle can be used as an egg yolk colourant instead of artificial pigments or other natural pigments (derived from marigold for yellow). Nettle has high carotenoid contents, especially lutein, β-carotene and zeaxanthin, of which lutein and zeaxanthin act as yellow pigments. Feeding as little as 6.25 g dry nettle per kg feed is as effective as the synthetic pigments to colour the egg yolk. Feeding nettle has no detrimental effect on the performance of the laying hens or on the general quality of eggs.

==== Ruminants ====
Ruminants avoid fresh stinging nettles; however, if the nettles are wilted or dry, voluntary intake can be high.

Table 3: Contents of ryegrass and nettle silage (g / kg dry matter, if not stated otherwise)
		Ryegrass silage	Nettle silage
Dry matter	DM	235	415
Metabolizable energy (MJ/ kg DM)	ME	11.3	9.8
Crude protein	CP	177	171
Neutral detergent fibre	NDF	536	552
Acid detergent fibre	ADF	338	434
Starch		-	-
Ash		113	118

==== Fish ====
Ground nettle has been purported as a beneficial feed in aquaculture.

=== Agriculture and horticulture ===
In the European Union, nettle extract can be used as an insecticide, fungicide, and acaricide under Basic Substance regulations. As an insecticide, nettle extract can be used for the control of codling moth, diamondback moth, and spider mites. As a fungicide, it can be used for the control of Pythium root rot, powdery mildew, early blight, late blight, Septoria blight, Alternaria leaf spot, and grey mould.

=== Gardening ===
Nettles have a number of uses in the vegetable garden, including the potential for encouraging beneficial insects. Since nettles prefer to grow in phosphorus-rich and nitrogen rich soils that have recently been disturbed (and thus aerated), the growth of nettles is an indicator that an area has high fertility (especially phosphate and nitrate), and thus is an indicator to gardeners as to the quality of the soil.

Nettles contain nitrogenous compounds, so are used as a compost activator or can be used to make a liquid fertiliser, which although low in phosphate, is useful in supplying magnesium, sulphur, and iron. They are also one of the few plants that can tolerate, and flourish in, soils rich in poultry droppings.

The stinging nettle is the red admiral caterpillar's primary host plant and can attract migrating red admiral butterflies to a garden.

U. dioica can be a troubling weed, and mowing can increase plant density. Regular and persistent tilling will greatly reduce its numbers, and the use of herbicides such as 2,4-D and glyphosate are effective control measures.

=== In culture ===
In Great Britain and Ireland, U. dioica and the annual nettle Urtica urens are the only common stinging plants and have found a place in several figures of speech in the English language. Shakespeare's Hotspur urges that "out of this nettle, danger, we pluck this flower, safety" (Henry IV, Part 1, Act II Scene 3). The figure of speech "to grasp the nettle" probably originated from Aesop's fable "The Boy and the Nettle". In Seán O'Casey's Juno and the Paycock, one of the characters quotes Aesop "Gently touch a nettle and it'll sting you for your pains/Grasp it as a lad of mettle and soft as silk remains". The metaphor may refer to the fact that if a nettle plant is grasped firmly rather than brushed against, it does not sting so readily, because the hairs are crushed down flat and do not penetrate the skin so easily.

In the German language, the idiom sich in die Nesseln setzen, or to sit in nettles, means to get into trouble. In Germanic mythology, the God of thunder, Thor, was associated with nettles, and that's where the saying "lightning won't strike into nettles" comes from. The idiom is used in Croatian, Hungarian, Serbian, and many other Indo-European languages. In Dutch, a netelige situatie means a predicament. In French, the idiom faut pas pousser mémé dans les orties (do not push granny into the nettles) means that we should be careful not to abuse a situation. The name urticaria for hives comes from the Latin name of nettle (Urtica, from urere, to burn).

The English word 'nettled', meaning irritated or angry, is derived from 'nettle'.

There is a common idea in Great Britain that the nettle was introduced by the Romans, but Plant Atlas 2020 treats it as native. The idea of its introduction was mentioned by William Camden in his book Britannia of 1586. However, in 2011, an early Bronze Age burial cist on Whitehorse Hill, Dartmoor, Devon, was excavated. The cist dated from between 1730 and 1600 BC. It contained various high value beads as well as fragments of a sash made from nettle fibre. It is possible that the sash was traded from mainland Europe, but perhaps more probable that it was locally made.

== See also ==
- Nettles in folklore
