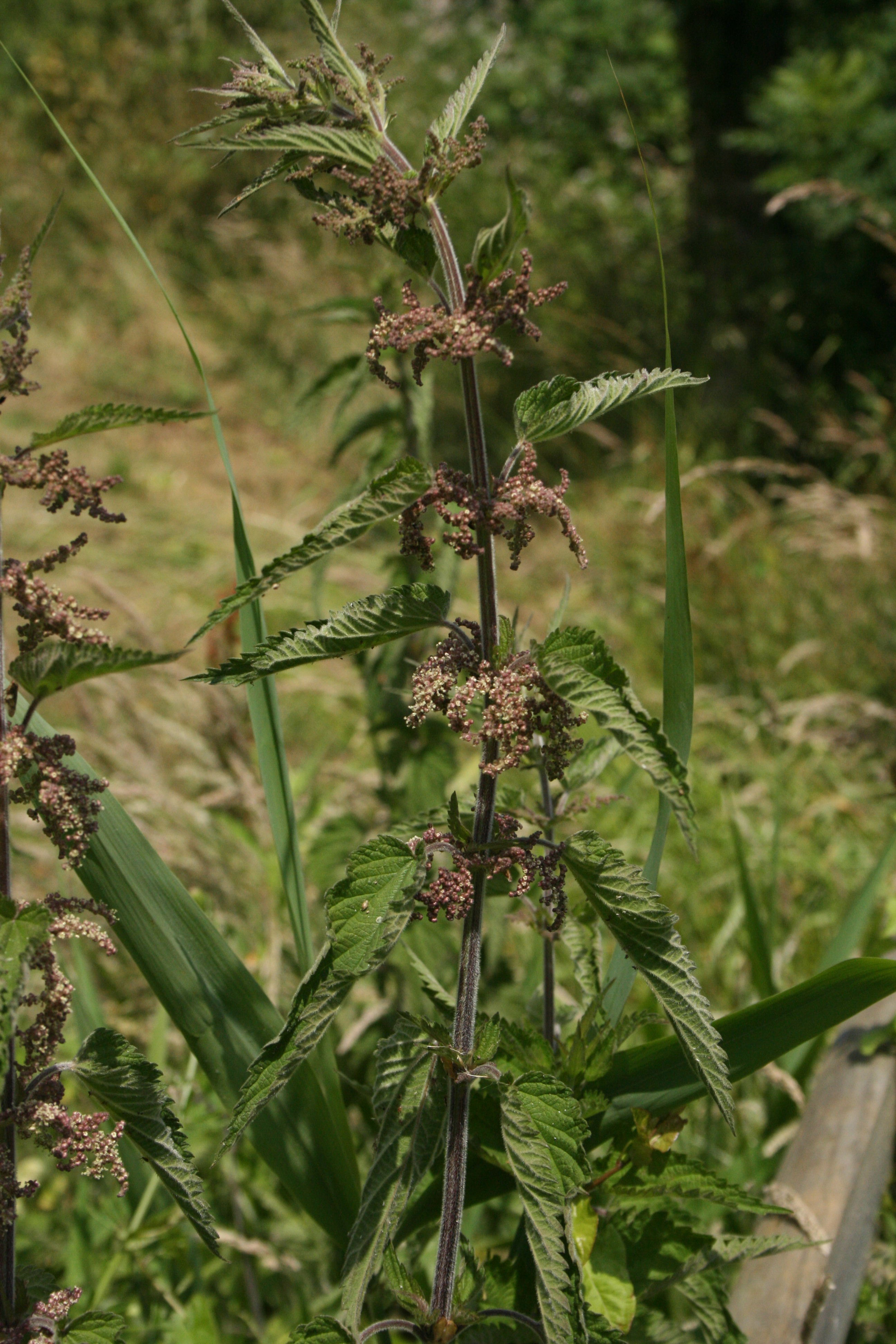

Scientific classification
- Kingdom: Plantae
- Clade: Tracheophytes
- Clade: Angiosperms
- Clade: Eudicots
- Clade: Rosids
- Order: Rosales
- Family: Urticaceae
- Genus: Urtica
- Species: U. dioica
- Subspecies: U. d. subsp. galeopsifolia

Trinomial name
- Urtica dioica subsp. galeopsifolia (Wierzb. ex Opiz) Chrtek

Synonyms
- Urtica galeopsifolia Wierzb. ex Opiz

= Urtica dioica subsp. galeopsifolia =

Subspecies of flowering plant

Urtica dioica subsp. galeopsifolia, the fen nettle or stingless nettle, is a herbaceous perennial plant found in Europe. It is considered to be either a subspecies of stinging nettle (Urtica dioica), or a species in its own right: Urtica galeopsifolia.

Unlike most other nettles, fen nettle has no stinging hairs or very few, instead being covered in fine, dense, non-stinging hairs. It has long, narrow leaves, these being reminiscent of the unrelated hemp nettles, Galeopsis. Fen nettle grows up to 2 metres (7 ft) tall.

It is distributed in west, central and east Europe, growing in damp, neutral soil in habitats such as fens and on riverbanks, often in dense stands. Unlike other subspecies of Urtica dioica, it is not associated with disturbed habitats.

Fen nettle may interbreed with European stinging nettle (Urtica dioica subsp. dioica), forming intermediate plants bearing both types of hairs.

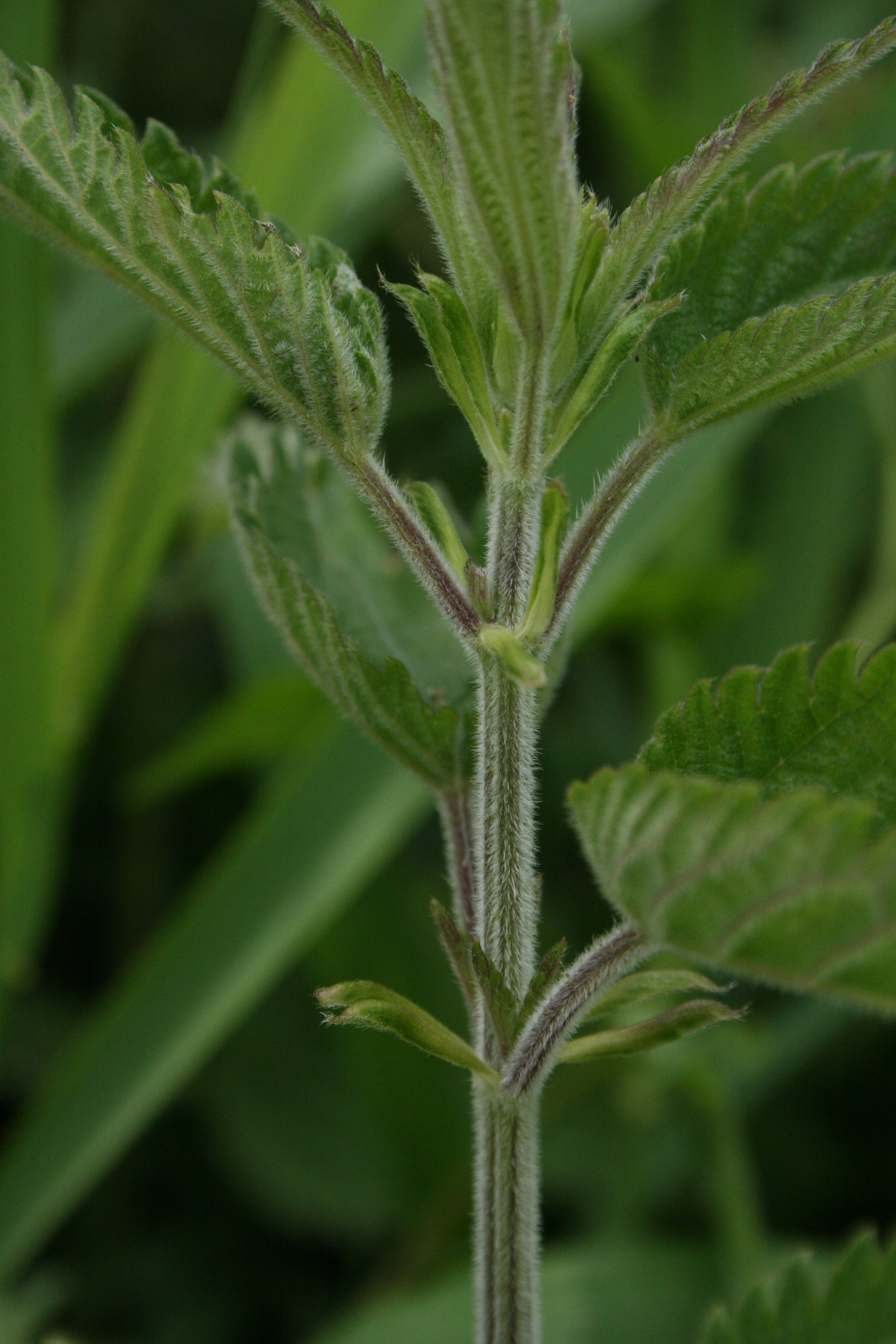
Fen nettle, showing fine hairs on stem, but no coarse stinging hairs
