= Urtica dioica subsp. afghanica =

Scientific classification
- Kingdom: Plantae
- Clade: Tracheophytes
- Clade: Angiosperms
- Clade: Eudicots
- Clade: Rosids
- Order: Rosales
- Family: Urticaceae
- Genus: Urtica
- Species: U. dioica
- Subspecies: U. d. subsp. afghanica

Trinomial name
- Urtica dioica subsp. afghanica Chrtek

Subspecies of plant

Urtica dioica subsp. afghanica is a subspecies of Urtica dioica in the Urticaceae family.

== Description ==
is a perennial that grows in the temperate biome.

== Habitat ==
It grows in partial shade in forests, thickets, grasslands and stream banks.
