= The Bottle Inn =

Pub in Marshwood, Dorset, England

Coordinates: 50°47′38″N 2°53′02″W

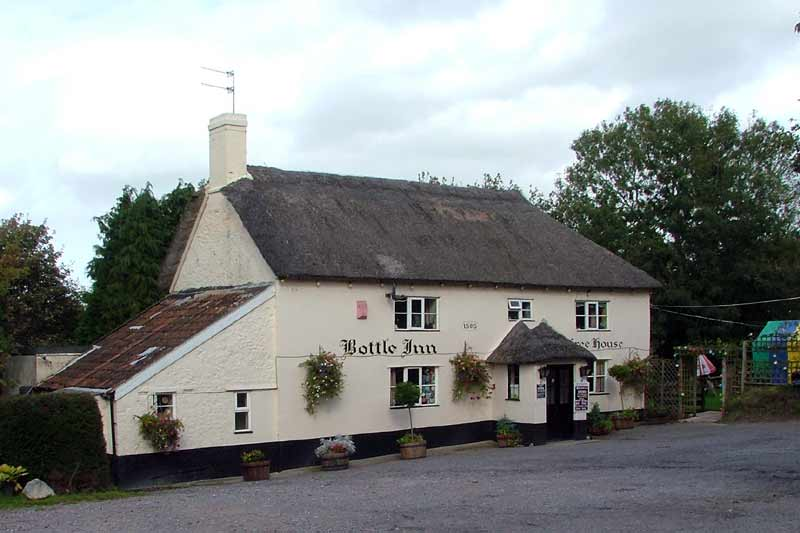
The Bottle Inn at Marshwood, Dorset

The Bottle Inn is a 16th-century public house at Marshwood in Dorset, England which hosts the World Nettle Eating Championship. It is Grade II listed.

== History ==
The building started life in 1585 as an ale house, being close to a church where people came to pay their tithes. It was named The Bottle Inn, some time late in the 18th century, when it became the first inn in the area to sell bottled beers. The Bottle Inn was purchased as a free house (not tied to any one brewery) in 1982 from Ushers Brewery by Michael and Pauline Brookes. In 2014, the public house won the CAMRA award for West Dorset pub of the year.

== World Nettle Eating Championship ==
The Bottle Inn hosts the annual World Nettle Eating Championships as part of a charity beer festival. Competitors are served 2-foot (0.61 m) long stalks of stinging nettles from which they pluck and eat the leaves. After an hour the bare stalks are measured and the winner is the competitor with the greatest accumulated length of nettles. The contest began in the late 1980s when two farmers argued over who had the longest stinging nettles in their field and evolved into the World Nettle Eating Championships when one of the farmers promised to eat any nettle which was longer than his. The championship has separate men's and women's sections and attracts competitors from as far afield as Canada and Australia.

In June 2010 Sam Cunningham, a fishmonger from Somerset won the contest, after eating 74 feet (23 m) of nettles. In June 2014 Phillip Thorne, a chef from Colyton, Devon won the contest, after eating 80 feet (24 m) of nettles. In 2017 the Overall Champion was Jonathan Searle from Solihull who munched his way through 70 feet of nettles whilst the Women's Prize went to Kate Ribton of Stoke St Gregory, in Somerset, who got through 28 feet (8.5 m) of the plant.
