= Food in England =

1954 book by Dorothy Hartley

- Cover of first edition, 1954
- Author: Dorothy Hartley
- Illustrator: Dorothy Hartley, and various old sources
- Subject: English cuisine
- Genre: History, cookery book
- Publisher: Macdonald
- Publication date: 1954
- Pages: 676

Food in England is a 1954 book by the social historian Dorothy Hartley. It is both a cookery book and a history of English cuisine. It was acclaimed on publication; the contemporary critic Harold Nicolson described the book as a classic. It has remained in print ever since.

The book provides what has been called an idiosyncratic and a combative take on the history of English cooking. The book is unusual as a history in not citing its sources, serving more as an oral social history from Hartley's own experiences as she travelled England as a journalist for the Daily Sketch, interviewing "the last generation to have had countryside lives sharing something in common with the Tudors." The book strikes some readers as principally a history, but it consists mainly of recipes. Some of these such as stargazey pie are old-fashioned, but all are practical recipes that can be cooked.

== Context ==
Dorothy Hartley's mother was from Froncysylltau, near Llangollen in North Wales, where the family owned quarries and property. In 1933 Hartley moved to a house in Froncysylltau, where she lived for the rest of her life. It was there that she began work on the book for which she is best known, Food in England, leading to its publication in 1954.

== Book ==
=== Approach ===
Most of the chapters address aspects of English food, whether types of food such as meat, eggs, fungi, and bread, or ways of dealing with food such as salting, drying and preserving. Some chapters such as 'Elizabethan households' are explicitly historical. Every chapter, however, is also a history. For example, chapter V, Meat, discusses "a rather interesting mediaeval miracle" and illustrates a traditional "Colonial Travelling Meat Safe of Mosquito Net". The text switches repeatedly from instructions ("To prepare mutton fat for a mutton piecrust, melt it over a bowl of hot water") to historical asides ("Mutton fat was used in the mountain-sheep districts for the same purposes as suet or goose-grease in the valleys"). Many of the processes are distinctly old-fashioned; thus, Hartley describes basting, dredging, and frothing, switching between the past and present tenses: "Dredging. This was done between bastings. Thus you dredge with powders or spices to give flavour, or with acid juices, or chopped herbs, which the pouring fat washes down into the crevices of the roasting meat."

A substantial part of the text consists of recipes. In the Meat chapter, these begin with recipes for beef, including "Baron of Beef", "Sirloin (Norman-French, sur loin)", "Rib of Beef", "Boiled Beef with Carrots", and "Oat Pudding, for Boiled Beef". Each recipe has a heading in italics; some have an illustration, drawn by Hartley, or else a quotation or proverb. There is no list of ingredients. The first paragraph often describes the dish or its ingredients. Thus for sirloin, she advises "This is the best beef joint and should be roasted. Never have the undercut taken out...". The instructions are given in a few paragraphs: "Let the sirloin be well hung; dust it lightly with dry mustard, pepper and brown flour to give a crisp crust; bed the fat end well under the lean undercut, and secure in place with string or carefully placed skewer. Roast carefully, basting frequently."

Where quantities or cooking temperatures have to be specified, these are included in the instructions; otherwise, matters are left to the cook's discretion. Thus in "Spice Sauce (sauce for fish or flesh)", Hartley directs "Take a quart of sharp cider, .... some mace, a few cloves, some lemon peel, horse-radish root sliced, some sweet herbs, 6 schaloys [shallots], 8 anchovies, 3 spoonfulls of shred red peppers..."

For baking, where exact instructions are needed, these are given in Imperial units, but the oven temperature and timing are again left mainly to the cook's experience. Thus for "Bath Buns", she instructs: "Make a light dough with 1/2 lb. of flour, 1/4 lb. of butter or lard, 1 oz. of castor sugar, 2 eggs, 1/2 pint of lukewarm milk, and about 1.2 oz. of yeast. Rub butter into flour; blend ... Set it to rise in a warm place, ... bake lightly and thoroughly till golden brown."

=== Contents ===
Food in England has 27 chapters:

- I Introduction
- II Some English Kitchens
- III Basic English
- IV Fuels and Fireplaces
- V Meat
- VI Poultry and Game
- VII Eggs
- VIII Mediaeval feast and famine
- IX Trade, Magic and Religious Cooking
- X Fish
- XI Seaweeds
- XII Fungi
- XIII Elizabethan households
- XIV The New World and the Sailors' Cook
- XV Salting, drying and preserving
- XVI The House and Garden in 1600
- XVII Vegetables
- XVIII New Freedom
- XIX Coaching Days
- XX Fruits, Herbs, Seeds and Flowers
- XXI The Hafod
- XXII Dairy produce
- XXIII Bread
- XXIV Drinks
- XXV The Industrial Revolution
- XXVI Pies, Puddings, Pastries, Cakes
- XXVII Sundry household matters

There is a bibliography and an index.

=== Editions ===
- 1954, 1st edition, London: Macdonald
- 1956, 2nd impression, London: Macdonald
- 1962, 3rd impression, London: Macdonald
- 1963, London: Readers Union
- 1964, London: Macdonald
- 1973, new impression, London: Macdonald
- 1975, 2nd edition, London: Macdonald
- 1979, London: Macdonald
- 1985, London: Futura
- 1996, London: Little, Brown
- 1999, London: Warner
- 2009, London: Piatkus

== Reception ==
=== Contemporary ===
On its publication in 1954, the book was received with immediate acclaim, and has remained in print ever since. The Manchester Guardian called it "fascinating…unusually readable"; Harold Nicolson in The Observer said, "it will become a classic", though he made gentle fun of the combative Englishness of Hartley's culinary pronouncements.

=== Modern ===
The Sunday Times, reviewing the seventh edition of the book, wrote "For food scholarship at its best see Dorothy Hartley's robust, idiosyncratic, irresistible Food in England... As packed with diverse and fascinating information as a Scotch bun with fruit, this untidy bundle of erudition is held together by the writer's huge enjoyment of her subject, her immense curiosity about everything to do with the growth, preparation, preservation and eating of food in this country since the Middle Ages."

The cultural historian Panikos Panayi describes the book as a tour de force, seminal, and richly illustrated; and he notes that Food in England is partly a recipe book, partly a history. He contrasts it favourably with Philip Harben's Traditional Dishes of Britain, published a year earlier, which he criticises as accepting the "stereotypical stalwarts of British food", whereas Hartley rightly accepts (Panayi quotes) that "foreign dishes ... like the foreigners, become 'naturalised English'".

The historian of food Bee Wilson, rereading "this endearing work" 58 years on for The Guardian, wrote that she had remembered it as a history book and an epic account of English cooking, "interspersed with recipes." She was therefore "startled" to find that almost the whole of the text is "taken up with practical recipes and techniques, with very little historical narrative." Wilson finds the book as Hartley explicitly intended, an untidy kitchen, "a warm friendly place". For Hartley, writes Wilson, "the past is not a foreign country", but ever-present. She notes that Hartley "announces dogmatically" that English cooking is old-fashioned "because we like it that way." Wilson finds "Hartley's devotion to archaic recipes such as stargazey pie and posset ... mildly crazed." But whether mad or not, Hartley "approaches the cuisine of the past with the humour and sharpness of a journalist."

The Historic Royal Palaces curator Lucy Worsley presented a BBC film, 'Food in England', The Lost World of Dorothy Hartley, on 6 November 2015. Worsley, writing in The Telegraph, calls Food in England "the definitive history of the way the English eat." She describes the book as "laden with odd facts and folklore ... a curious mixture of cookery, history, anthropology and even magic, ... with her own strong and lively illustrations." She admits it is not a conventional history, since Hartley breaks "the first rule of the historian: to cite her evidence. She wasn't fond of footnotes." In a year of filming Hartley's places and people she knew, Worsley discovered that "my frustration with her technique as historian was misplaced." Hartley had travelled continually to gather materials for her weekly Daily Sketch column, (Note: Her dispatches to the Daily Sketch 1933–1936 have been collected in a book) sometimes sleeping rough "in a hedge". The work is thus effectively, Worsley argues, an oral history, as Hartley interviewed "the last generation to have had countryside lives sharing something in common with the Tudors." The emphasis on local, seasonal food chimes well, Worsley suggests, with the modern trend for just those things.

The Museum of English Rural Life at the University of Reading curates the Dorothy Hartley collection. It cites the Oxford Dictionary of National Biography's entry on Hartley, calling Food in England "Arguably her best work, and the one for which she will be remembered". It calls the book "as full of magic and potions as any medieval herbal."
