= Dorothy Hartley =

English social historian, illustrator, and author

Dorothy Hartley

Dorothy Rosaman Hartley (4 October 1893 – 22 October 1985) was an English social historian, illustrator, and author. Daughter of a clergyman, she studied art, which she later taught. Her interest in history led her into writing. Among her books are six volumes of The Life and Work of the People of England, covering six centuries of English history.

She is best known as the author of the book Food in England, which has had a strong influence on many contemporary cooks and food writers. Delia Smith called it "A classic book without a worthy successor – a must for any keen English cook." It combines an historical perspective on its subject with the practical approach of an experienced cook. It has remained in print ever since its publication in 1954.

== Biography ==
=== Early years ===
Hartley was born at Ermysted's Grammar School, Skipton, Yorkshire, the youngest of three children of the headmaster of the school, the Rev Edward Tomson Hartley (1849–1923) and his wife, Amy Lucy, née Eddy (1853–1932). In her 1954 book, Food in England, Hartley gave an autobiographical sketch using the kitchens of her various homes as the background: "My first kitchen was a stone-floored cottage in the Yorkshire dales…Fresh mountain air and the smell of cooking always filled this brightly polished kitchen." She was educated at a convent of French nuns at Skipton until 1904, where, she recalled, "the kitchen was alive with stir and bustle, the clatter of clogs and pails, and the aroma of breakfast coffee." In 1904, Edward Hartley retired from the headmastership of the school and became rector of a country parish at Rempstone, Nottinghamshire. Dorothy Hartley recalled, "A lovely old house with every mediaeval inconvenience. The nearest shop was five miles away and we had no car. A butcher called once a week, a grocer once a fortnight; and the wine, coal and brewery every six months. With one maid and a weekly washerwoman it was not an easy house to run."

After her secondary education at Loughborough High School Hartley attended Nottingham Art School. During the First World War she temporarily abandoned her studies and worked in a munitions factory. In 1919 she entered the Regent Street Polytechnic in London where she was, according to the Oxford Dictionary of National Biography, a prize pupil. She returned to Nottingham Art School as a teacher in 1920–22. She continued to teach, in London and elsewhere, for many years.

=== Historical books ===
While earning her living as an art teacher, Hartley began writing in her spare time. She sometimes commented on her lack of education, but as The Times noted, "Later achievement suggests she more than made up for it." Many of her books are scholarly in nature, and were reviewed favourably by expert critics. Together with Margaret M. Elliot she wrote Life and Work of the People of England, in six volumes, published between 1925 and 1931. In 1930 she published The Old Book, "A Mediaeval Anthology Edited and Illuminated by Dorothy Hartley" with an introduction by Professor George Saintsbury. In 1931 she "collated and edited" the poet Thomas Tusser's Good Points of Husbandry.

Also in 1931 Hartley published what was, until Food in England in 1954, her best-known book, Medieval Costume and Life. In it she showed the clothes of peasants depicted in old manuscripts, with diagrams to show how they were made, and photographs of models wearing them, one of the models being Hartley herself.

In addition to her skill as an illustrator, Hartley was a keen photographer. In 1931 she travelled by car from Egypt to the Congo, taking many photographs which were later exhibited at the Imperial Institute in London. Between 1932 and 1936 she toured the British Isles by bicycle and car, writing weekly articles for The Daily Sketch. Her topics included horse-ploughing, bread making, and clog making. She later used material she had gathered during these trips in her books, Here's England (1934), The Countryman's England (1935), and Made in England (1939). A tour of a slightly different kind was one she made of Ireland, retracing the steps of the mediaeval prelate Giraldus Cambrensis who had accompanied Prince John there in the twelfth century. This led to her book Irish Holiday (1938), of which one reviewer wrote, "If you want to see Ireland in extreme and unnecessary discomfort, Irish Holiday will tell you how to do this…my only criticism against an enthralling book."

=== Food in England ===
Hartley's mother was from Froncysyllte, near Llangollen in north Wales, where the family owned quarries and property. In 1933 Hartley moved to a house in Froncysyllte, where she lived for the rest of her life. It was there that she began work on the book for which she is best known, Food in England, with its chapters on kitchens, fuels and fireplaces, meat, poultry, game, eggs, mediaeval feast and famine, fish, fungi, Elizabethan households, the New World, salting, drying, preserving, dairy produce, bread, the Industrial Revolution, and "sundry household matters", all written from the viewpoint of an historian and also a practical and old-fashioned cook.

On its publication in 1954, the book was received with immediate acclaim, and has remained in print ever since. The Manchester Guardian called it "fascinating…unusually readable"; Harold Nicolson in The Observer said, "it will become a classic", though he made gentle fun of the combative Englishness of Hartley's culinary pronouncements. The Sunday Times, reviewing the seventh edition of the book later wrote, "For food scholarship at its best see Dorothy Hartley's robust, idiosyncratic, irresistible Food in England... As packed with diverse and fascinating information as a Scotch bun with fruit, this untidy bundle of erudition is held together by the writer's huge enjoyment of her subject, her immense curiosity about everything to do with the growth, preparation, preservation and eating of food in this country since the Middle Ages."

=== Later years ===
In the post-war years Hartley taught at University College and Goldsmiths' College in London, appeared on television with the chef Philip Harben, and advised on the BBC Archers rustic soap-opera. In 1964 she published Water in England, of which the ODNB writes, "This remarkable work is full of valuable information on all manner of related phenomena such as holy springs, well digging, leather jugs, spa hotels, and suchlike." Her last work, "The Land of England", was published when the author was 86, but as The Times commented, she could "still depend on her excellent memory rather than on notes and filing cabinets." The reviewer of The New Yorker wrote, "[Her] prose is lucid, demure and unemphatic. Her wit is dry and subtle. She never nudges or buttonholes the reader, but trusts to her material which is almost bewilderingly rich."

In her later years she wrote occasionally for The Guardian, on topics including wool and traditional sheep-shearing; the British Museum; "funeral biscuits"; apple-scoops made from sheep's bones; tame slugs; donkeys; a fourteenth-century feast; and mysterious old culinary terms (such as "pestils of pora", "mortrews" and "mawney").

Hartley, who remained unmarried, died at Fron House, Froncysyllte, aged 92.

== Books ==
=== As author ===
- (with Margaret M Elliot) (1925). Life and Work of the People of England – Volume I: The eleventh to thirteenth centuries. London: Batsford. OCLC 399655.
- (with Margaret M Elliot) (1928). Life and Work of the People of England – Volume II: The fourteenth century. London: Batsford. OCLC 773207276.
- (with Margaret M Elliot) (1925). Life and Work of the People of England – Volume III: The fifteenth century. London: Batsford. OCLC 769297231.
- (with Margaret M Elliot) (1925). Life and Work of the People of England – Volume IV; The sixteenth century. London: Batsford. OCLC 769297235.
- (with Margaret M Elliot) (1928). Life and Work of the People of England – Volume V: The seventeenth century. London: Batsford. OCLC 51078014.
- (with Margaret M Elliot) (1931). Life and Work of the People of England – Volume VI: The eighteenth century. London: Batsford. OCLC 250339291.
- (with Margaret M Elliot) (1930). How Medieval Folk Lived. Exeter: Wheaton. OCLC 16810890.
- Mediaeval Costume and Life. London: Batsford. 1931. OCLC 250304000. (reissued in 2003 under the title Medieval Costume and How to Recreate it)
- Here's England. London: Rich and Cowan. 1934. OCLC 1804454.
- The Countryman's England. London: Batsford. 1935. OCLC 28907764.
- Irish Holiday. London: Lindsay Drummon. 1939. OCLC 753130225.
- Made in England. London: Methuen. 1939. OCLC 776806052.; 3rd ed. 1950; 4th ed. 1973; Little Toller Books edition 2018 (includes introduction by Fran Edgerley)
- Food in England. London: MacDonald and Jane's. 1954. OCLC 2434661.
- Water in England. London: MacDonald and Jane's. 1964. OCLC 2719939.
- The Land of England: English Country Customs Through the Ages. London: MacDonald and Jane's. 1979. OCLC 59152487. (Published in the USA as Lost Country Life, Pantheon, 1980)

=== As editor ===
- The Old Book – A Medieval Anthology. London and New York: Knopf. 1930. OCLC 2460722.
- Thomas Tusser, 1557 Floruit, His Good Points of Husbandry. London: Country Life Books. 1931. OCLC 1663565.

=== As artist ===
- Ye Sundial Booke. London: E. Arnold. 1914. OCLC 960145012.
