= Peter De Greef =

British actor (1922–1980)

Peter De Greef (17 May 1922 – 29 March 1980) was a British actor who made a number of film appearances in the 1940s and 50s including Champagne Charlie (1944).

He was born as Edward Denaston William De Greeff in 1922 in Marylebone in London, the son of Muriel Ethel née Breakey (1902–1964) and Edward Maurice De Greef (1894–1975), a chemical merchant. By 1943 during World War II he was serving in the Royal Air Force with the rank of Leading aircraftman. His film roles include RAF airman in The Big Blockade (1942) and Lord Petersfield in Champagne Charlie (1944), while his television roles included First Journalist in the BBC television play It's an Ill Wind (1952).

In 1946 aged 23 he married the 35 year-old film actress Dorothy 'Chili' Boucher at Kensington in London. They separated a few months later and the marriage was finally dissolved in 1955. In 1957 he married Sheila J. Greene at Marylebone Register Office.

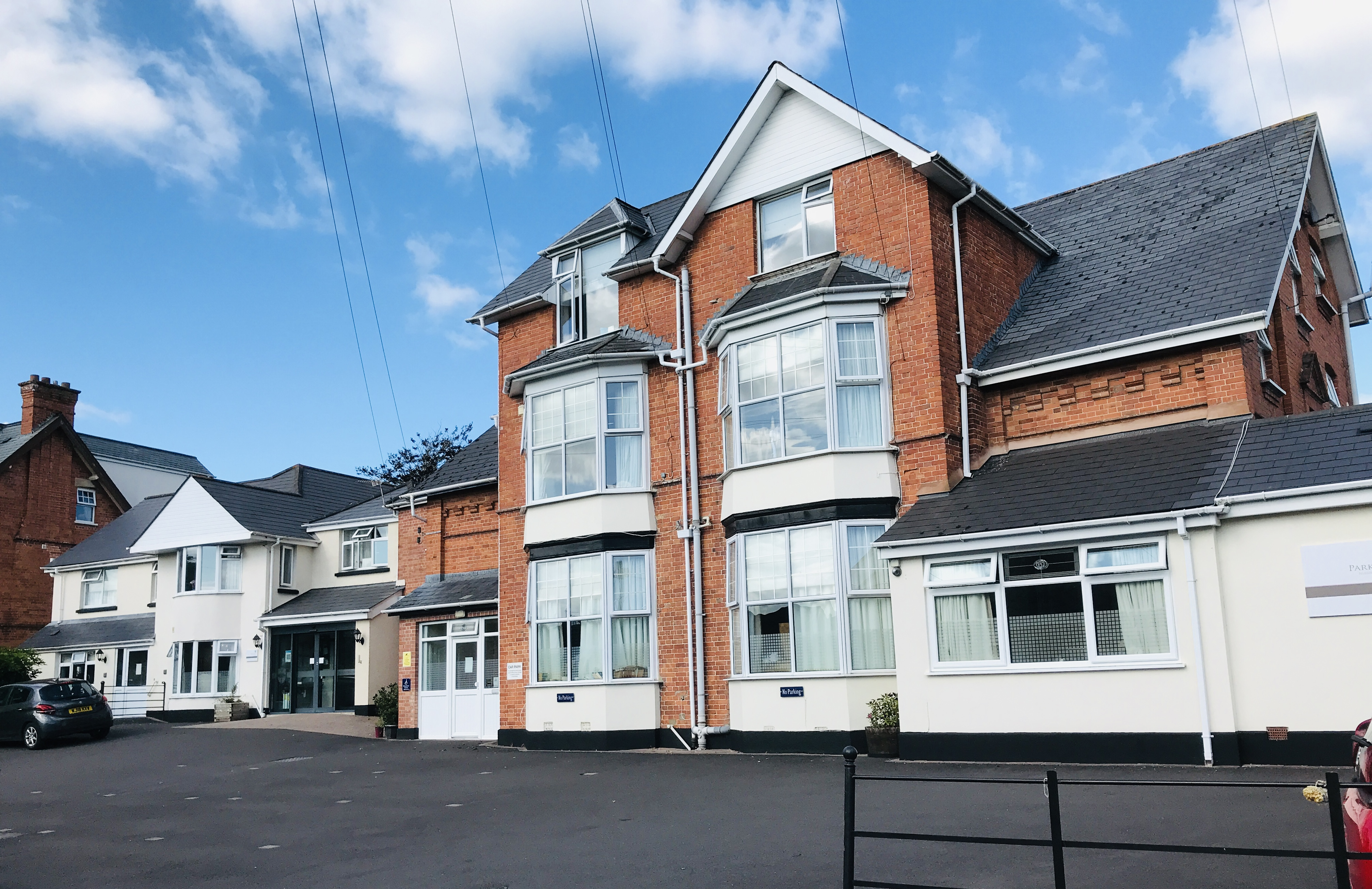
De Greef died in Heathermoor Nursing Home – now Park Lane Care Home (seen here in 2021)

Peter De Greef died in Heathermoor Nursing Home in Barnstaple in Devon in 1980 aged 57 and left £4,783 in his will.
