= List of Sloanea species =

Sloanea is a widespread genus of plants in the family Elaeocarpaceae, native to tropical and subtropical parts of Asia, Australasia, the Pacific, and tropical and subtropical America.

== Species ==
The following 187 species are accepted by Plants of the World Online as of October 2026:

== A-C ==
- Sloanea aberrans (Brandis) A.C.Sm.
- Sloanea aculeata A.C.Sm.
- Sloanea acutiflora Uittien
- Sloanea aequatorialis T.D.Penn.
- Sloanea akaraiensis T.D.Penn.
- Sloanea ampla I.M.Johnst.
- Sloanea amygdalina Griseb.
- Sloanea anoriensis T.D.Penn.
- Sloanea arguta T.D.Penn.
- Sloanea australis (Benth.) F.Muell.
- Sloanea bathiei Tirel
- Sloanea berteroana Choisy ex DC.
- Sloanea billardierei (Vieill.) A.C.Sm.
- Sloanea brachystyla (Schltr.) A.C.Sm.
- Sloanea brachytepala Ducke
- Sloanea brassii (O.C.Schmidt) A.C.Sm.
- Sloanea brenesii Standl.
- Sloanea brevipes Benth.
- Sloanea brevispina Earle Sm.
- Sloanea cararaensis T.D.Penn.
- Sloanea caribaea Krug & Urb. ex Duss
- Sloanea carrenoi Steyerm.
- Sloanea castanocarpa Triana & Planch.
- Sloanea cataniapensis Steyerm.
- Sloanea cavicola Steyerm.
- Sloanea cayapensis J.Jaram. & J.E.Guevara
- Sloanea celebica Boerl. & Koord.-Schum.
- Sloanea changii Coode
- Sloanea chingiana Hu
- Sloanea chocoana Pal.-Duque
- Sloanea conferta T.D.Penn.
- Sloanea congesta T.D.Penn.
- Sloanea crassifolia Earle Sm.
- Sloanea cruciata T.D.Penn.
- Sloanea cruenta Lundell
- Sloanea cuautitlanensis Cuevas & J.L.Mend.
- Sloanea curatellifolia Griseb.
- Sloanea cymosa T.D.Penn.

== D-I ==
- Sloanea dasycarpa (Benth.) Hemsl.
- Sloanea davidsei Steyerm.
- Sloanea decussata T.D.Penn.
- Sloanea dentata L.
- Sloanea dubia Boeira
- Sloanea duckei Earle Sm.
- Sloanea durissima Spruce ex Benth.
- Sloanea dussii Urb.
- Sloanea echinocarpa Uittien
- Sloanea eichleri K.Schum.
- Sloanea ensiformis T.D.Penn.
- Sloanea erismoides Ducke
- Sloanea erythrocarpa T.D.Penn.
- Sloanea esmeraldana Pal.-Duque
- Sloanea eugenifloresiae Aguilar & D.Santam.
- Sloanea excelsa Ducke
- Sloanea faginea Standl.
- Sloanea fendleriana Benth.
- Sloanea ferruginea T.D.Penn.
- Sloanea floribunda Spruce ex Benth.
- Sloanea forbesii F.Muell.
- Sloanea fragrans Rusby
- Sloanea froesii Earle Sm.
- Sloanea garcia-cossioi Pal.-Duque
- Sloanea garckeana K.Schum.
- Sloanea geniculata Dam.A.Sm.
- Sloanea grandezii Vásquez
- Sloanea grandiflora Sm.
- Sloanea grandis Ducke
- Sloanea granulosa Ducke
- Sloanea grossa Earle Sm.
- Sloanea guapilensis Standl.
- Sloanea guianensis (Aubl.) Benth.
- Sloanea gymnocarpa A.C.Sm.
- Sloanea hainanensis Merr. & Chun
- Sloanea haplopoda (Guillaumin) A.C.Sm.
- Sloanea harrisoniorum T.D.Penn.
- Sloanea hatschbachii D.Samp. & V.C.Souza
- Sloanea helianthoides Fern.Alonso & Pal.-Duque
- Sloanea hemsleyana (Ito) Rehder & E.H.Wilson
- Sloanea herrerae Aguilar & D.Santam.
- Sloanea heteroneura Boeira
- Sloanea hirsuta (Schott) Planch. ex Benth.
- Sloanea huilaeana Pal.-Duque & Fern.Alonso
- Sloanea ilicifolia Urb.
- Sloanea illinizae T.D.Penn.
- Sloanea insularis A.C.Sm.
- Sloanea integrifolia Chun & F.C.How

== J-P ==
- Sloanea jamaicensis Hook.
- Sloanea jaramilloi J.E.Guevara & D.Fernández
- Sloanea javanica (Miq.) Szyszył. ex K.Schum.
- Sloanea koghiensis Tirel
- Sloanea kuhlmannii Ducke
- Sloanea laevigata Dam.A.Sm.
- Sloanea lanceolata Earle Sm.
- Sloanea langii F.Muell.
- Sloanea lasiocarpa Pittier
- Sloanea latifolia (Rich.) K.Schum.
- Sloanea laurifolia (Benth.) Benth.
- Sloanea ledermannii A.C.Sm.
- Sloanea lepida Tirel
- Sloanea leptocarpa Diels
- Sloanea longiaculeatae Y.F.Xie & Z.X.Zhang
- Sloanea longisepala Tirel
- Sloanea loquitoi Pal.-Duque
- Sloanea macbrydei F.Muell.
- Sloanea macrophylla Benth. ex Turcz.
- Sloanea magnifolia Tirel
- Sloanea malayana Coode
- Sloanea medusula K.Schum. & Pittier
- Sloanea megaphylla Pittier
- Sloanea meianthera Donn.Sm.
- Sloanea merevariensis Pittier ex Steyerm.
- Sloanea mexicana Standl.
- Sloanea minima T.D.Penn.
- Sloanea mollis Gagnep.
- Sloanea montana (Labill.) A.C.Sm.
- Sloanea morii T.D.Penn.
- Sloanea multinervis J.E.Guevara, D.Fernández & W.Palacios
- Sloanea nitida G.Don
- Sloanea nymanii K.Schum.
- Sloanea obtusifolia (Moric.) K.Schum.
- Sloanea pacuritana Pal.-Duque
- Sloanea paradisearum F.Muell.
- Sloanea parkinsonii C.E.C.Fisch.
- Sloanea parva D.Samp.
- Sloanea parviflora Planch. ex Benth.
- Sloanea parvifructa Steyerm.
- Sloanea paucinervia T.D.Penn.
- Sloanea petalata D.Samp. & V.C.Souza
- Sloanea petenensis Standl. & Steyerm.
- Sloanea picapica Standl.
- Sloanea pilosa J.E.Guevara
- Sloanea platyphylla Standl.
- Sloanea poilanei Coode
- Sloanea pseudogranulosa Pal.-Duque
- Sloanea pseudoverticillata Boeira
- Sloanea pubescens Benth.
- Sloanea pubiflora Planch. & Linden ex Benth.
- Sloanea pulchra (Schltr.) A.C.Sm.
- Sloanea pullei O.C.Schmidt ex A.C.Sm.
- Sloanea pulleniana Coode
- Sloanea pulvinata T.D.Penn.

== R-Z ==
- Sloanea ramiflora Tirel
- Sloanea raynaliana Tirel
- Sloanea retusa Uittien
- Sloanea revoluta T.D.Penn.
- Sloanea rhodantha (Baker) Capuron
- Sloanea rojasiae Vásquez
- Sloanea rosea T.D.Penn.
- Sloanea rubiginosa T.D.Penn.
- Sloanea rufa Planch. ex Benth.
- Sloanea rugosa Dam.A.Sm.
- Sloanea schippii Standl.
- Sloanea schomburgkii Spruce ex Benth.
- Sloanea schumannii Warb.
- Sloanea sericea T.D.Penn.
- Sloanea shankii Standl. & L.O.Williams
- Sloanea sigun (Blume) K.Schum.
- Sloanea sinemariensis Aubl.
- Sloanea sinensis (Hance) Hemsl.
- Sloanea sogerensis Baker f.
- Sloanea spathulata Earle Sm.
- Sloanea sterculiacea (Benth.) Rehder & E.H.Wilson
- Sloanea steyermarkii Earle Sm.
- Sloanea streimannii Coode
- Sloanea suaveolens Tirel
- Sloanea subpsilocarpa Steyerm.
- Sloanea synandra Spruce ex Benth.
- Sloanea terniflora (Moc. & Sessé ex DC.) Standl.
- Sloanea tieghemii (F.Muell.) A.C.Sm.
- Sloanea tiwintza T.D.Penn.
- Sloanea tomentosa (Benth.) Rehder & E.H.Wilson
- Sloanea trichosticha R.O.Williams & Sandwith
- Sloanea trinitensis Sandwith
- Sloanea truncata Urb.
- Sloanea tuerckheimii Donn.Sm.
- Sloanea uncinata T.D.Penn.
- Sloanea uniflora D.Samp. & V.C.Souza
- Sloanea usurpatrix Sprague & L.Riley
- Sloanea velutina (Schltr.) A.C.Sm.
- Sloanea veracruzana T.D.Penn.
- Sloanea verrucosa Ducke
- Sloanea versteeghii A.C.Sm.
- Sloanea woollsii F.Muell.
- Sloanea wurdackii Steyerm.
- Sloanea xichouensis K.M.Feng ex Y.Tang & Y.C.Hsu
- Sloanea yasuniana T.D.Penn.
- Sloanea zuliaensis Pittier
