= List of date palm diseases =

This article is a list of diseases of date palms (Phoenix dactylifera).

== Fungal diseases ==
Fungal diseases
Bayoud (Fusariose)	Fusarium oxysporum f.sp. albedinis
Belaat	Phytophthora sp.
Bending head	Ceratocystis paradoxa Chalara paradoxa [anamorph] = Thielaviopsis paradoxa Lasiodiplodia theobromae = Botryodiplodia theobromae
Black leaf spot	Coniothyrium palmarum (Israel, India and Cyprus)
Black scorch	Ceratocystis paradoxa Chalara paradoxa [anamorph]
Diplodia disease	Diplodia phoenicum Lasiodiplodia theobromae = Diplodia natalensis
Fruit rots	Alternaria spp. Aspergillus spp. Fusarium spp. Penicillium spp., etc.
Graphiola leaf spot	Graphiola phoenicis
Inflorescence rot	Diplodia spp. Fusarium spp. hielaviopsis spp.
Khamedj	Mauginiella scaettae
Leaf dieback	Alternaria sp.
Omphalia root rot	Omphalia tralucida Omphalia pigmentata
Pestalotia leaf spot	Pestalotiopsis palmarum = Pestalotia palmarum
Taches brunes (brown leaf spot)	Mycosphaerella tassiana Cladosporium herbarum [anamorph]
Terminal bud rot	Ceratocystis paradoxa Chalara paradoxa [anamorph]
Wilt of fruit bunches	Fusarium moniliforme

== Nematodes, parasitic ==
Nematodes, parasitic
Root knot	Meloidogyne arenaria Meloidogyne hapla Meloidogyne incognita Meloidogyne javanica
Root lesion	Pratylenchus penetrans

== Insect pests ==
Insect pests
hole excavation	Rhynchophorus ferrugineus
seed eating	Coccotrypes dactyliperda
sap sucking, sooty mould formation	Ommatissus lybicus (the "Dubas bug")

== Bacteria ==
Bacterial diseases
Pink Rot of Inflorescence	Serratia marcescens
