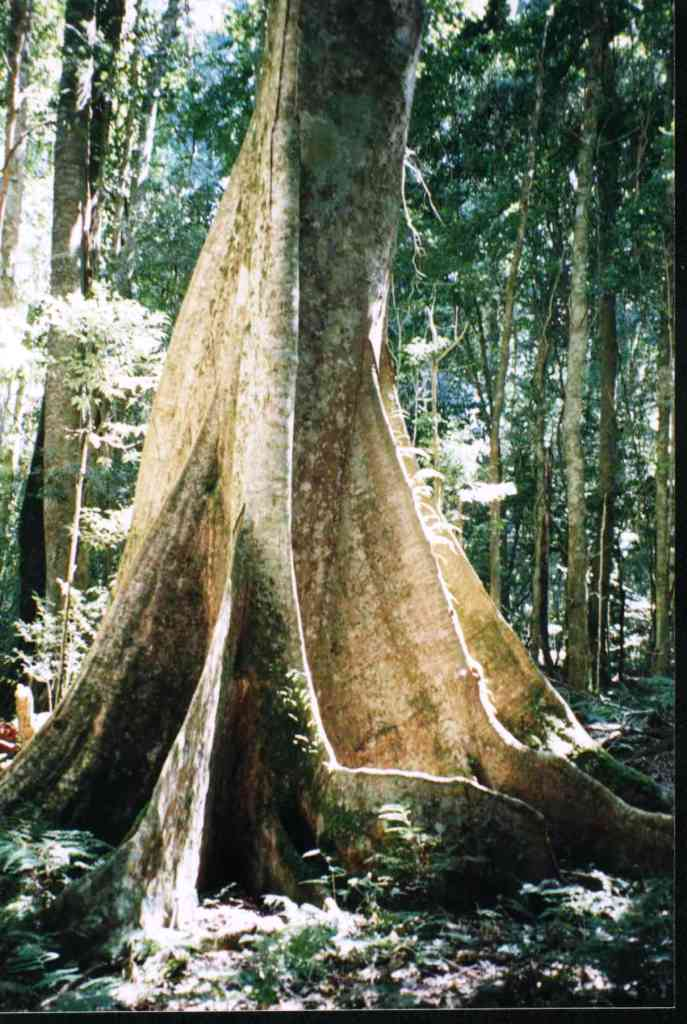
- Yellow carabeen at Werrikimbe National Park

Scientific classification
- Kingdom: Plantae
- Clade: Tracheophytes
- Clade: Angiosperms
- Clade: Eudicots
- Clade: Rosids
- Order: Oxalidales
- Family: Elaeocarpaceae
- Genus: Sloanea
- Species: S. woollsii

Binomial name
- Sloanea woollsii F.Muell.

= Sloanea woollsii =

Yellow carabeen

Species of flowering plant native to Australia

Sloanea woollsii, commonly known as yellow carabeen, carribin, grey carrobean, or eslanea amarela in Portuguese, is a large tree species with plank buttresses that is native to northeastern NSW and eastern Queensland, Australia. Its southern distributional limit is near the town of Bulahdelah (32° S) at Tallowwood Forest Park and O'Sullivans Gap Reserve.

== Description ==
The carabeen is a very large single-stem rainforest tree that can reach 55 m (180 ft) tall with a trunk diameter of 250 cm (98 in). Prominent plank buttresses protrude at the base with buttresses sometimes reaching as tall as 4 m (13 ft). The crown is usually spreading and open.

It typically requires between 1,300 and 1,700 mm (51 and 67 in) of rainfall and a soil alkalinity of 5 to 6.5 pH.

== Ecology and distribution ==
Sloanea woollsii is one of the common tree species in subtropical rainforests of Australia growing up to 55 metres tall. It is a typical long-lived (up to 800 years), slow growing and shade tolerant climax species.

== Taxonomy and phylogeny ==
S. woollsii is one of 184 species accepted by the Catalogue of Life to be in the Sloanea genus. Sloanea is the second largest of the 12 genera within the Elaeocarpaceae family (which also contains the blue marble tree, Elaeocarpus angustifolius, the maqui or Chilean wineberry, Aristotelia chilensis, and the Chilean lantern tree, Crinodendron hookerianum).

According to the Open Tree of Life project, which aggregates phylogenetic research, this species is likely an offshoot of a branch containing S. sogerensis, S. australis, and S. langii. The following phylogenetic relationships are suggested:

- Sloanea
  - - S. terniflora
    - - - S. berteroana (montillo or bullwood)
        - S. guianensis
      - - S. woollsii
        - - S. sogerensis
          - - S. australis (maiden's blush)
            - S. langii
  - all other Sloanea species
- - Aristotelia (18 species)
  - Vallea (2 species)
