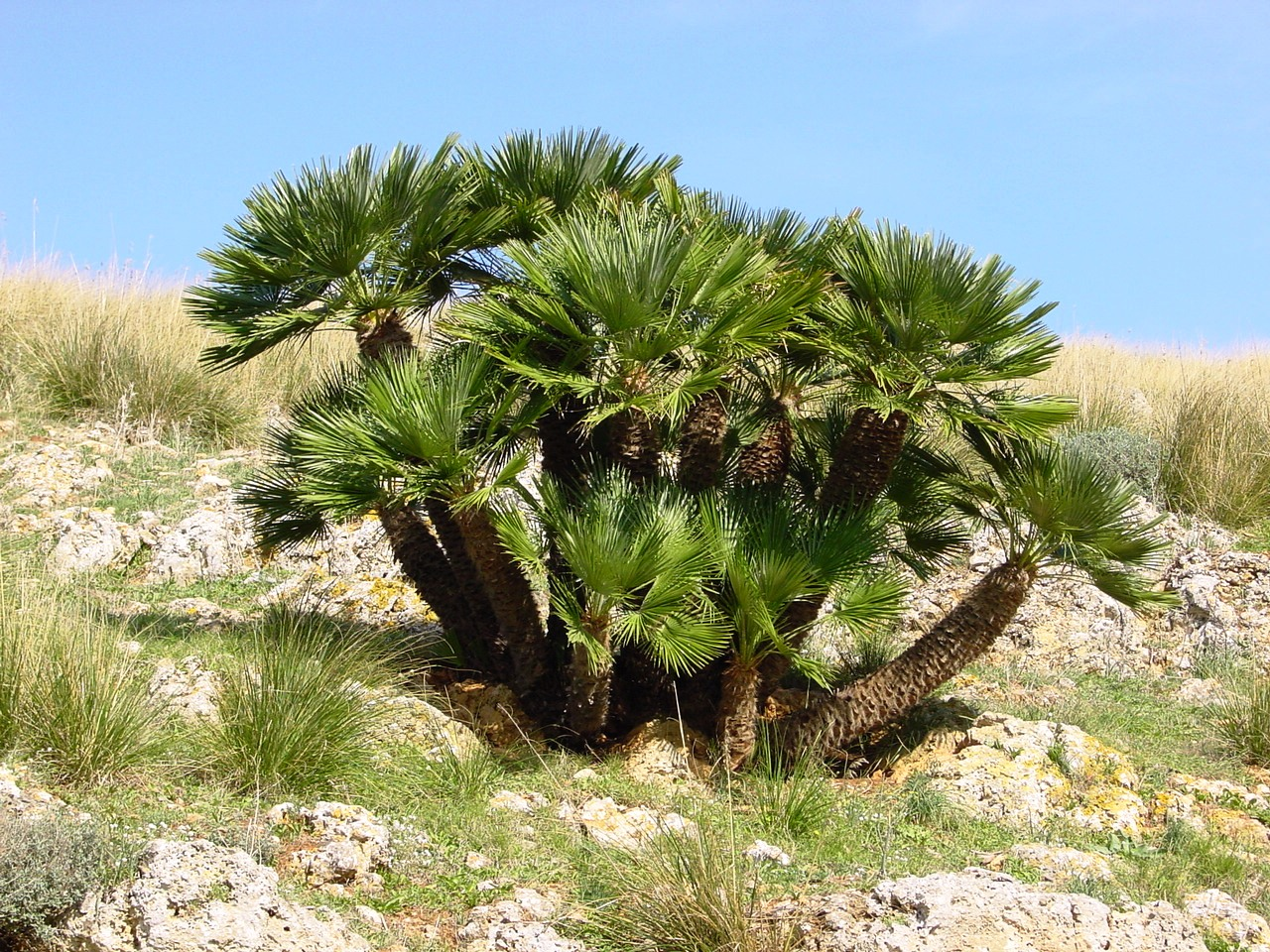
- Chamaerops humilis var. humilis, Zingaro, Sicily
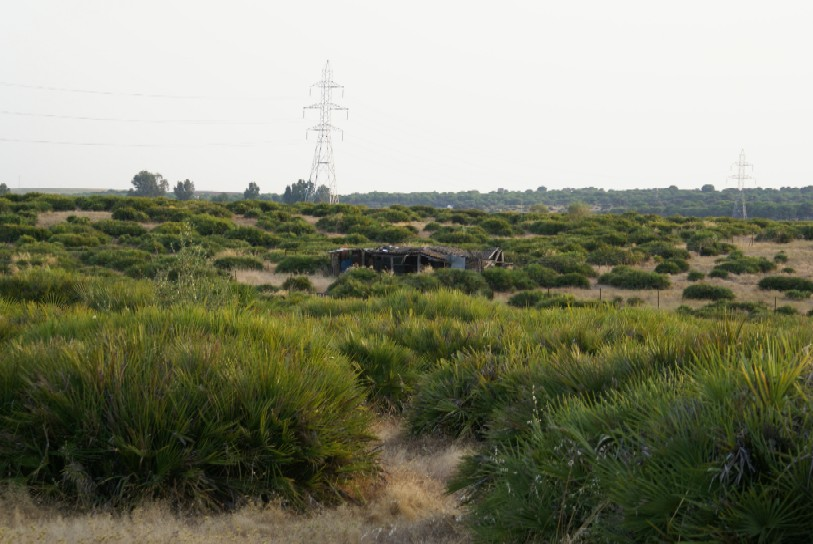
- Large monospecific patch of C. humilis in southwest Spain.

Conservation status
- Least Concern (IUCN 3.1)

Scientific classification
- Kingdom: Plantae
- Clade: Embryophytes
- Clade: Tracheophytes
- Clade: Spermatophytes
- Clade: Angiosperms
- Clade: Monocots
- Clade: Commelinids
- Order: Arecales
- Family: Arecaceae
- Subfamily: Coryphoideae
- Tribe: Trachycarpeae
- Genus: Chamaerops; L.
- Species: C. humilis

Binomial name
- Chamaerops humilis L.
- Continuous range ✖ Isolated population

Synonyms
- Several, including: Chamaerops elegans Hook. f.

= Chamaerops =

Genus of palms

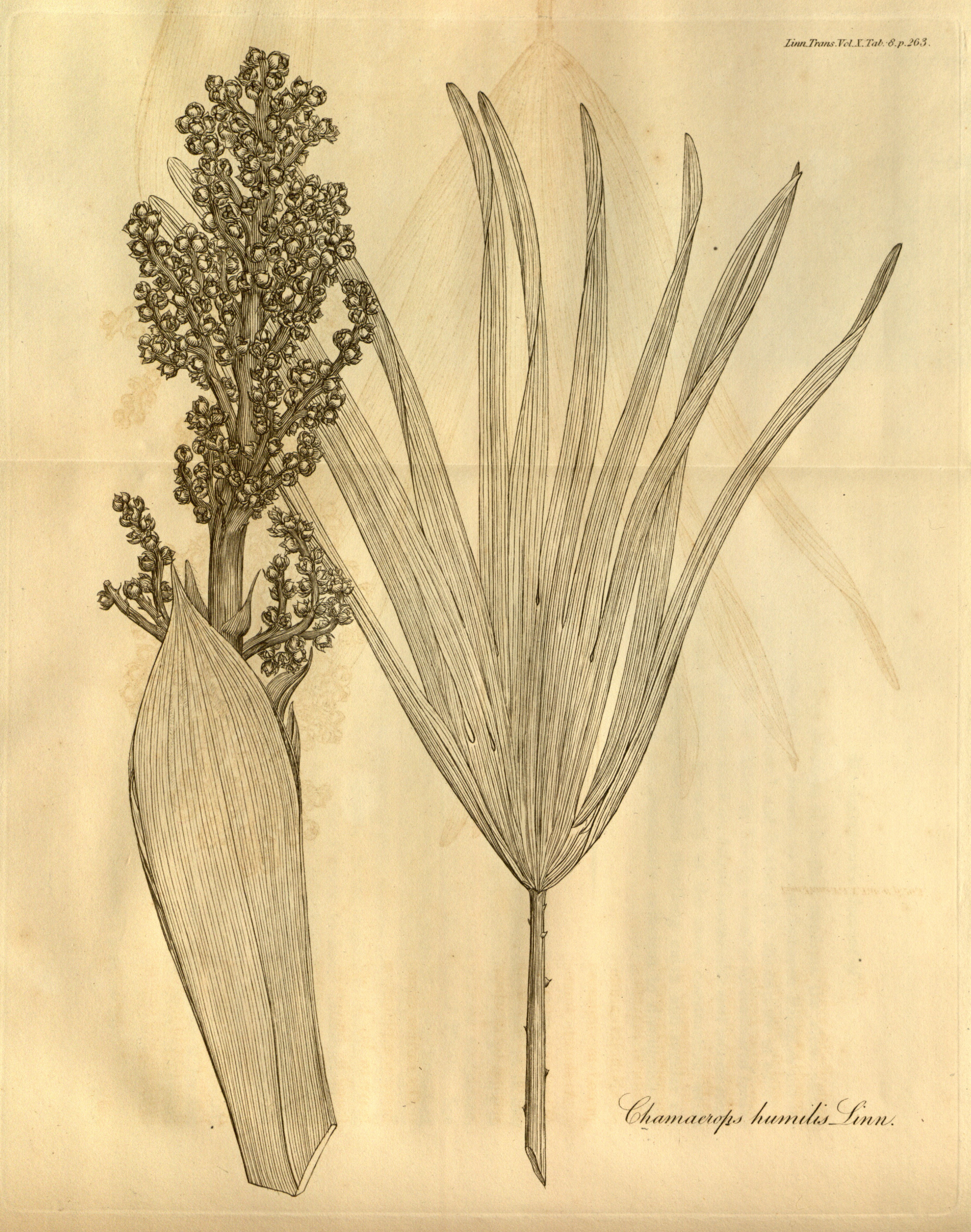
Transactions of the Linnean Society of London, vol. 10: t. 8 (1815)

Chamaerops is a genus of flowering plants in the family Arecaceae. It contains only one species, Chamaerops humilis, variously called European fan palm or the Mediterranean dwarf palm. It is one of the most cold-hardy palms and is used in landscaping in temperate climates.

== Taxonomy ==
Apart from the universally accepted Chamaerops humilis, there are a few potential taxa of unresolved status, plus numerous species synonymised under Chamaerops humilis. The genus Chamaerops is closely related to the genus Trachycarpus. The genera differ in that Trachycarpus lacks the clumping habit (only forms single stems without basal suckers), the spiny leaf stems (spineless in Trachycarpus), and in small details of the flower anatomy.

=== Subspecies ===
The species Chamaerops humilis itself has two accepted varieties as follows:

- Chamaerops humilis var. argentea André (syn. C. h. var. cerifera) – "Atlas mountains palm" of Northwest Africa. Leaves glaucous.
- Chamaerops humilis var. humilis – Southwest Europe. Leaves green.

There also are at least three cultivars: C. humilis var. humilis 'Nana', C. humilis 'Vulcano', and C. humilis 'Stella'. C. humilis 'Vulcano' is a compact, thornless cultivar that may be silvery, but less so than var. argentea. The leaves tend to be thicker, and the appearance of the plant is bushier than var. humilis or var. argentea.

== Description ==
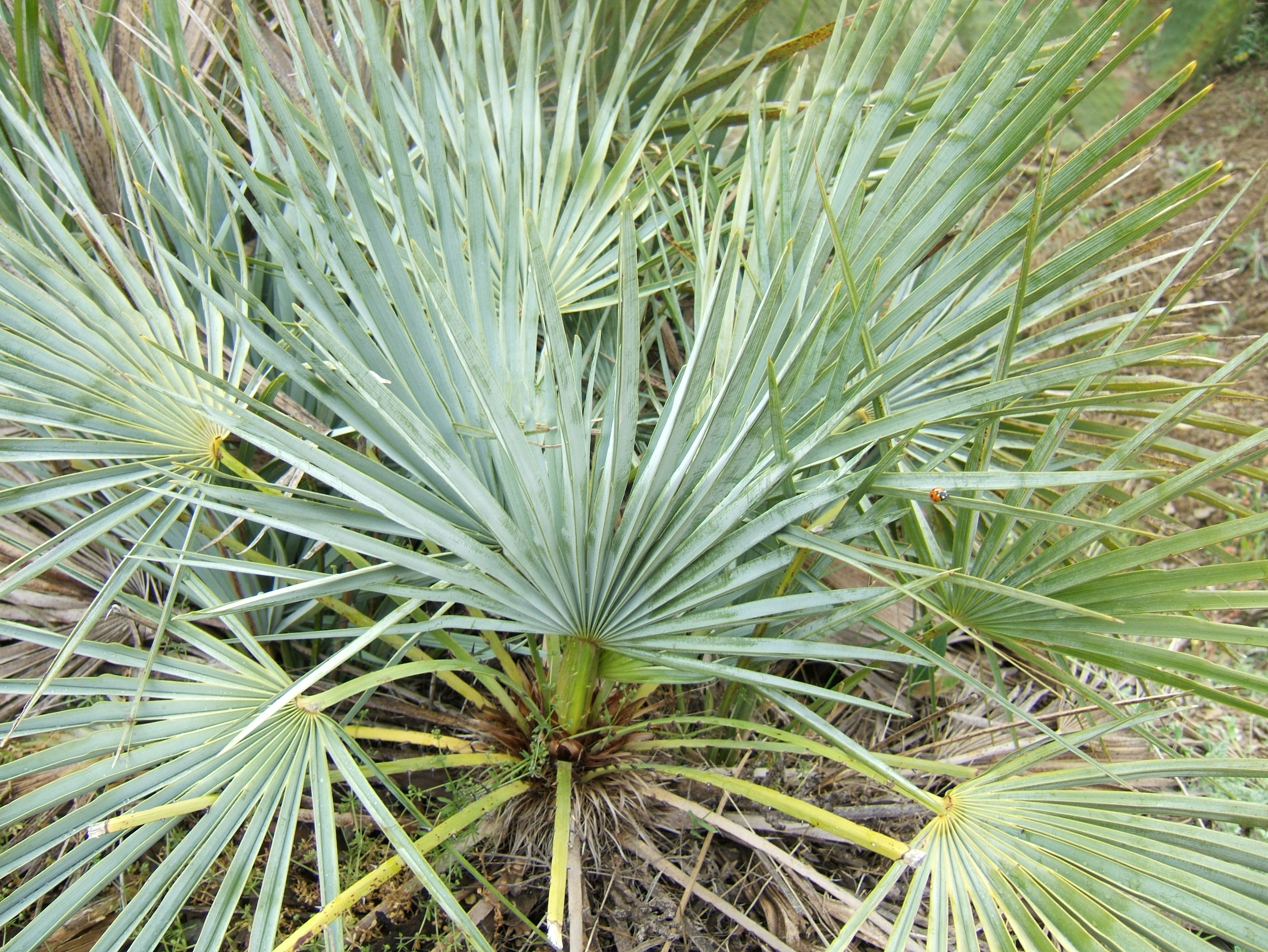
Chamaerops humilis var. argentea, south slopes of the High Atlas, Morocco. Zoom in to see the spines on the petioles.

Chamaerops humilis is a shrub-like clumping palm, with several stems growing from a single base. It has an underground rhizome which produces shoots with palmate, sclerophyllous leaves.

The stems grow slowly and often tightly together, eventually reaching 2–5 m (10–20 ft) tall with a trunk diameter of 20–25 cm (8–10 in). It is a fan palm (Arecaceae tribe Corypheae), and as such, has leaves with petioles terminating in rounded fans of 10–20 leaflets. Each leaf is up to 1.5 m (5 ft) long, with leaflets 50–80 cm (20–30 in) long. The petioles are armed with numerous sharp, needle-like spines; these may protect the stem growing point from browsing animals.

The flowers are borne in dense, short inflorescences at the tops of the stems. The plants usually, but not invariably, are dioecious with male and female flowers on separate plants. The prophyll covers the flowers on the inflorescence until the sexual phase (anthesis) and then splits open apically into two triangular lobes. The number of flowers per inflorescence is highly variable for both male and female plants, depending on the size of the inflorescence. Female flowers are tri-ovulate. Unripe fruits are bright green, turning to dull yellow to brown as they ripen during autumn (September–November). The seed (usually 0.6–0.8 g or 1/50–3/100 oz) contains a small cylindrical embryo, which is surrounded by several layers, from inner to outer as follows:

- a nutritious endosperm,
- a wide woody layer or endocarp,
- a fleshy and fibrous mesocarp (the pulp), and
- the thin outer layer or exocarp.

== Distribution ==
Chamaerops humilis is one of only two palm species native to continental Europe, the other being Phoenix theophrasti. It is mainly found in southwestern Europe, over all the south coasts of Spain and Portugal, central and southern Italy, parts of the southern Mediterranean coast of France and Monaco, on the islands of Malta, Sicily, Sardinia, Corsica, and the Balearic Islands, as well as North Africa in Morocco, Algeria and Tunisia. It is one of the northernmost naturally occurring palms in the world, with the northernmost native standing in Genoa, Italy, at 44°N. Although not naturally occurring far north from the Mediterranean, Chamaerops humilis grows well as far north as southern England.

== Cultivation ==
Chamaerops humilis is valued in gardening and landscaping in many parts of the world. It is very drought-tolerant once established. It is hardy to −12 °C (10 °F), but does prefer hot summers. It is a very slow-growing plant. A blue form of the species, native to high elevations of the Atlas Mountains, has recently been introduced into the trade and early reports indicate that it may be 12 °C (22 °F) or more hardier than the green form.

In Europe, it is widely cultivated across the Mediterranean, as well as in the southern portions of the U.K. In the United States, Chamaerops is cultivated along the West Coast from southern California to the Pacific Northwest coast, along the East Coast from Georgia to Maryland, and in several areas of the drier southwestern United States. Chamaerops is also cultivated in New Zealand and several parts of Australia.

It has gained the Royal Horticultural Society's Award of Garden Merit.

== Ecology ==
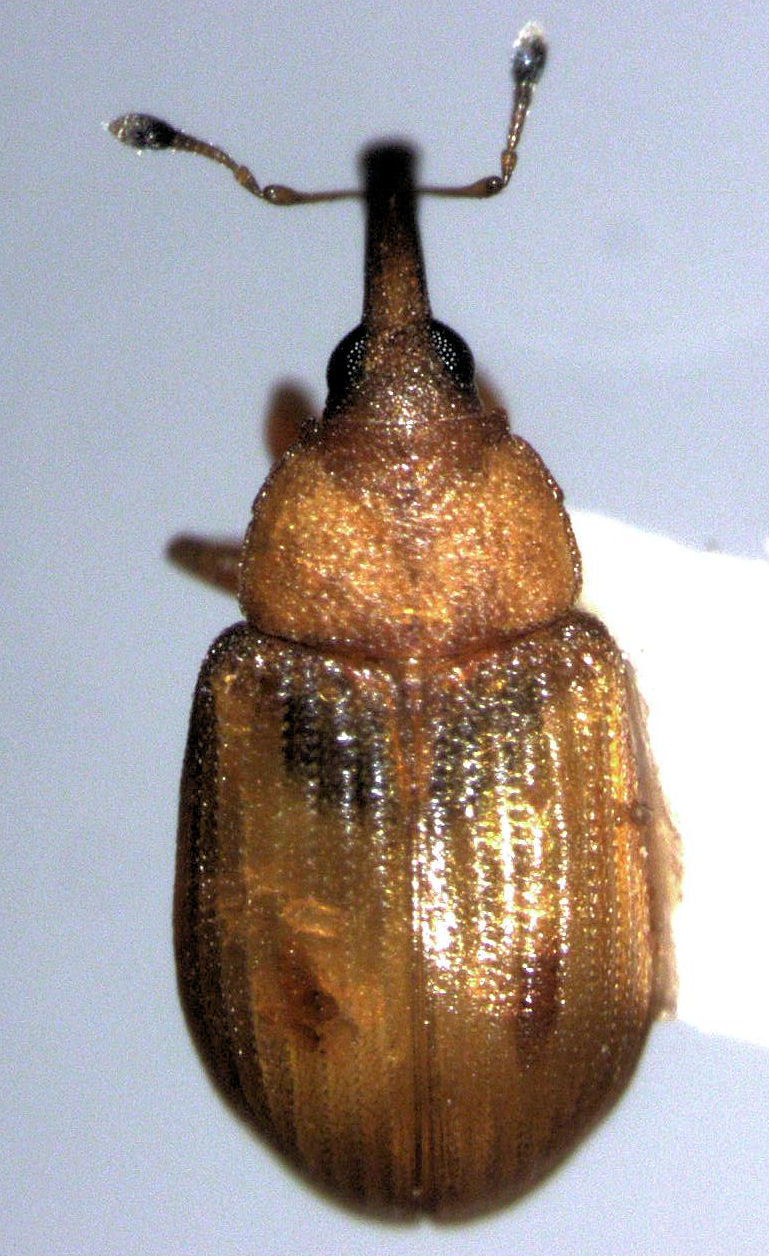
Derelomus chamaeropsis, a weevil, is the only known significant insect pollinator of Chamaerops humilis.

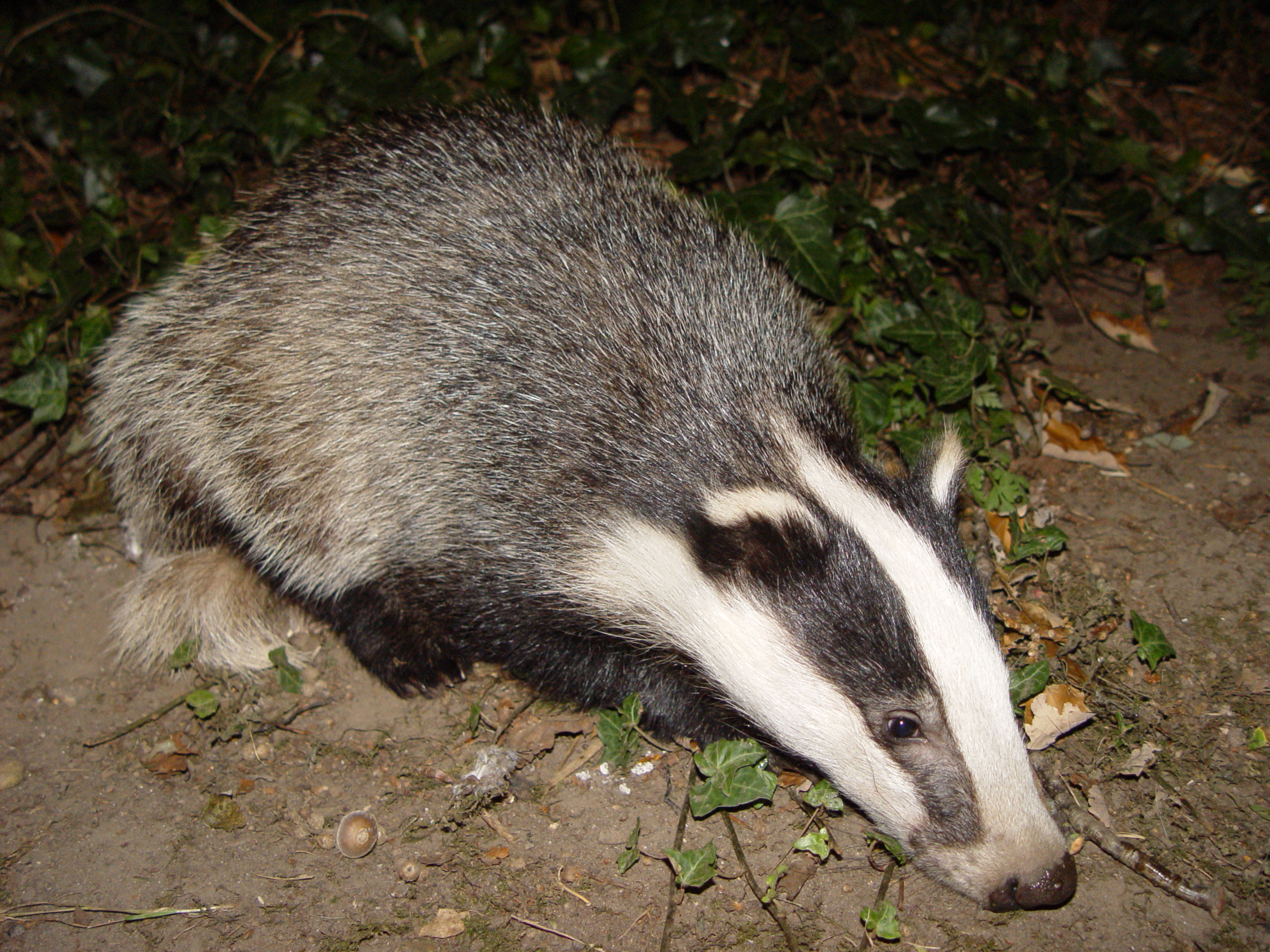
In southern Spain, the Eurasian badger Meles meles is the main seed disperser of C. humilis

Chamaerops humilis has a wide distribution in uncultivated land, and it is adapted to regimes of frequent burning, which it survives largely by re-sprouting from underground rhizomes and from fire-damaged stems. Such factors make the species ecologically important in preventing erosion and desertification and in providing shelter and food to many species of animals.

Chamaerops humilis flowers in spring, typically from April to May. The plant also may be partly anemophilous (wind-pollinated), but it is at least partly entomophilous (insect-pollinated). Only one insect species is known to pollinate it, namely a specific weevil, Derelomus chamaeropsis, in the family Curculionidae. The nature of the relationship with the weevil is a version of nursery pollination mutualism with the weevil; the form this takes is that once pollinating weevils have found a satisfactory plant, whether male or female, they usually stay on the same plant until the end of its anthesis, finding shelter, egg-laying sites, and food in the inflorescences.

At anthesis, as is common in angiosperms, both male and female Chamaerops humilis plants attract their pollinators with chemical compounds, but an unusual feature is that their scents are released by the leaves, and not by the flowers. Towards the end of anthesis, weevils leave the plant and seek a new host plant, again either male or female.

Larval development of the weevil Derelomus chamaeropsis occurs within rachises of inflorescences of male plants during autumn and winter. At the beginning of the next flowering period, adult weevils emerge from the dry and brittle stems of old inflorescences of the previous year of male plants only. Those that hatch in female plants die without concluding their development. This is because the palmettos are adapted to prevent the pollinating weevils from destroying the female inflorescences with their burden of seed. Weevils have been shown to lay eggs within female inflorescences, but as soon as seeds start to develop, eggs or larvae fail to continue their life cycle. On the other hand, male inflorescences have completed their function after pollination, so it is advantageous to the plant's reproduction for the weevils to complete their life cycles and shelter in the male inflorescences, thereby remaining available for pollination when they emerge in the following season.

The ripe pulp of C. humilis has several important functions.

- When ripened, the pulp smells strongly of rancid butter and thus acts as a foraging cue for nocturnal frugivores that commonly are fundamentally carnivorous mammals such as badgers and foxes.
- The pulp inhibits germination, ensuring that the seed does not germinate until it has been dispersed.
- The pulp also acts as a chemical or physical barrier against invertebrate seed predators, typically beetles, and in particular weevils.

Because of the combination of such functions in the pulp, the palm both benefits and suffers adverse consequences when carnivores feed on the fruit and thereby remove the pulp. On the one hand, the seeds that carnivores swallow, germinate more frequently than seeds in entire fruit. On the other hand, ingested seeds are more frequently destroyed by invertebrate pests than non-ingested seeds. However, because of the mobility of carnivores, their dispersal service is important to the palmetto, given the severe fragmentation and isolation of most populations across the increasingly densely populated Mediterranean basin.

The fungus Coniothyrium palmarum which has been found associated with leaf spots on Phoenix dactylifera (Arecaceae) in India and Cyprus, has been found on a dead petiole (leaf stalk) of Chaemerops humilis (Arecaceae) in Italy.

== Uses ==
Apart from its material benefits, this palmetto is of emotional value as a charismatic component of the "garrigues" and "macchias" of the Mediterranean coastline.

The leaves of the adult plants have been used to make brooms and for weaving mats, carrier baskets, and similar articles. For finer work the young, unopened leaves are treated with sulphur to soften them and provide supple fibre.

The husk, known in southern Spain as "higa", is edible before it becomes too tough to eat as it matures. Because of their bitterness and high tannin content, the fruit are not used for human food, but in traditional medicine they have been used as an astringent.

== Conservation ==
Urbanization and other human activities are making such rapid inroads into the natural habitat of the palm that they are raising concerns about the future of the species and its environment. Accordingly, there is an increase in regulations to protect both its stands and those of associated Mediterranean endemics.

Another conservation problem is that particularly in the northernmost parts of its natural range, Chamaerops humilis is seriously threatened by an introduced South American moth Paysandisia archon. Also, this Mediterranean native palm is affected by the introduction of related ornamental species because of the concurrent introduction of seed predators (such as Coccotrypes dactyliperda and Dactylotrypes longicollis) that feed on both the introduced and native palms.

== Gallery ==
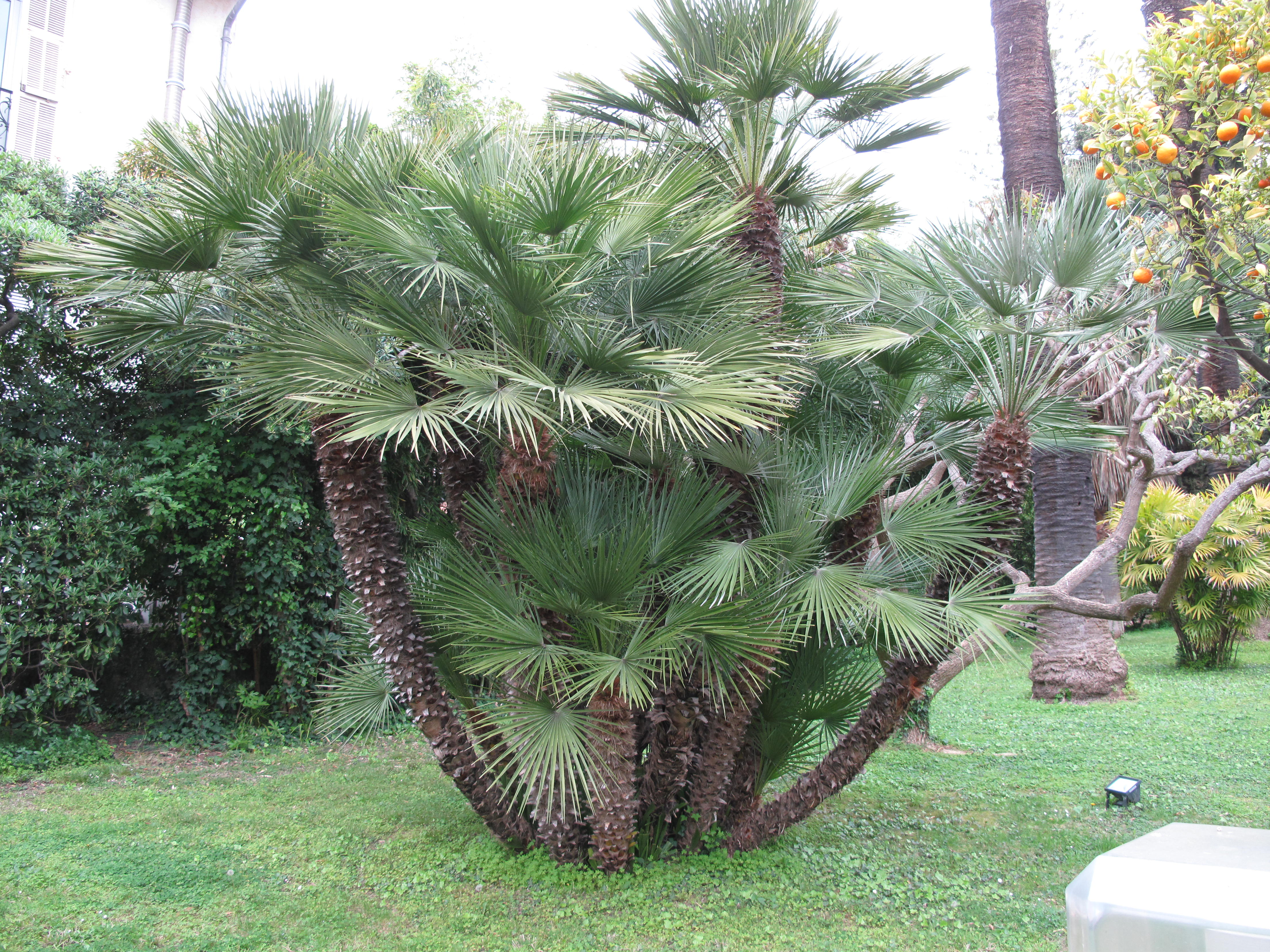
Group of European fan palms in Menton, Alpes-Maritimes, France

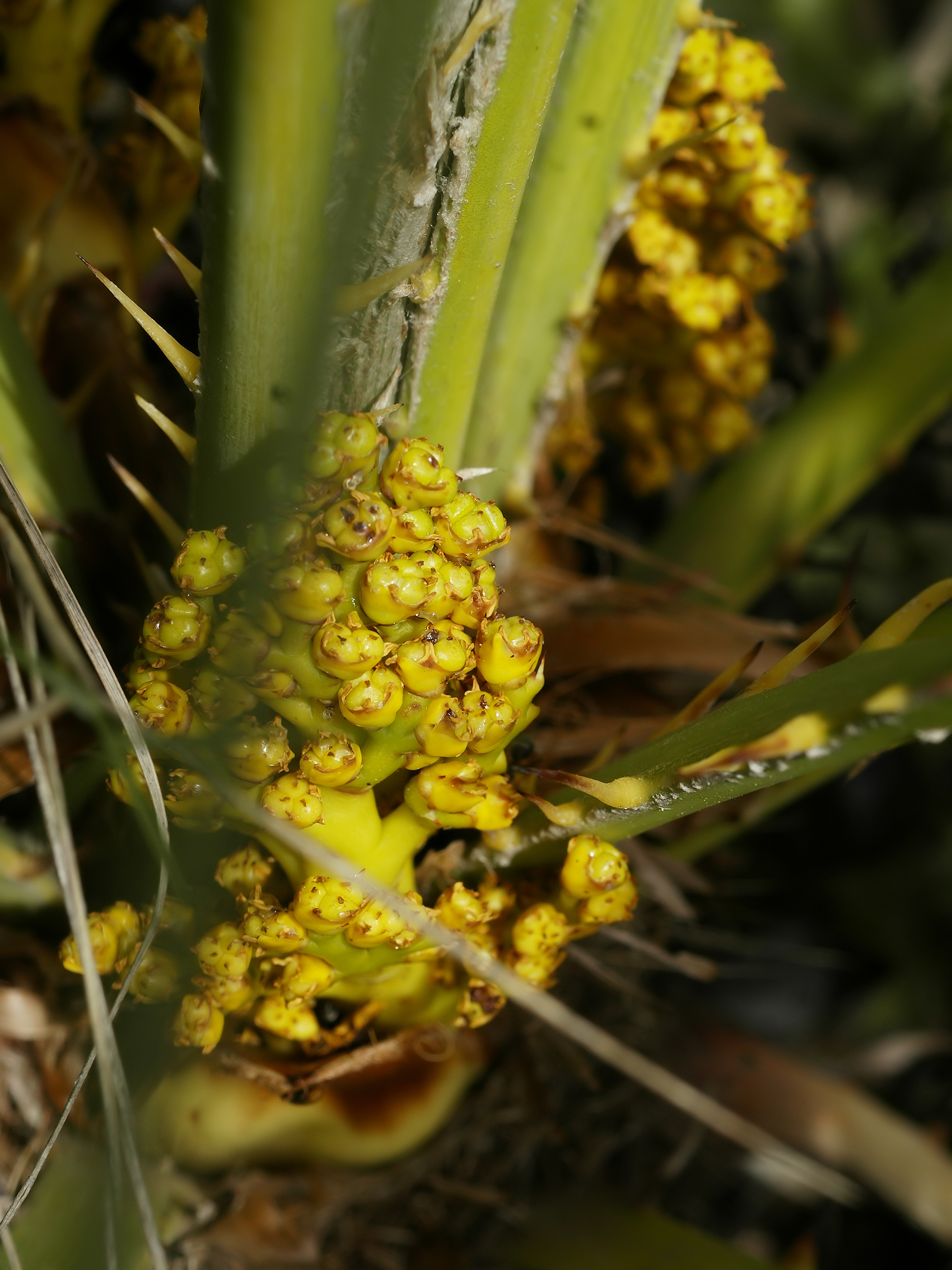
Female flowers

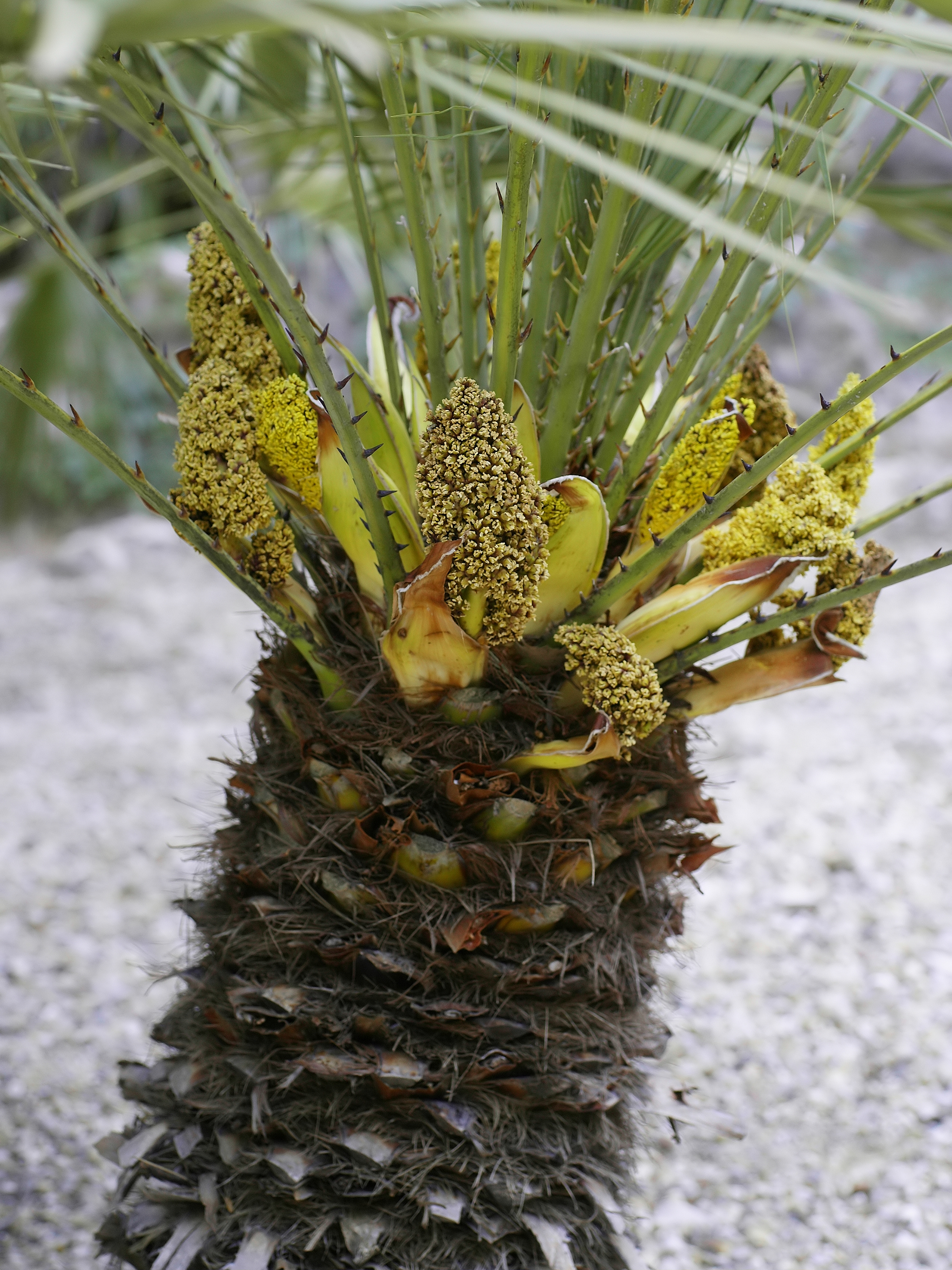
Male flowers

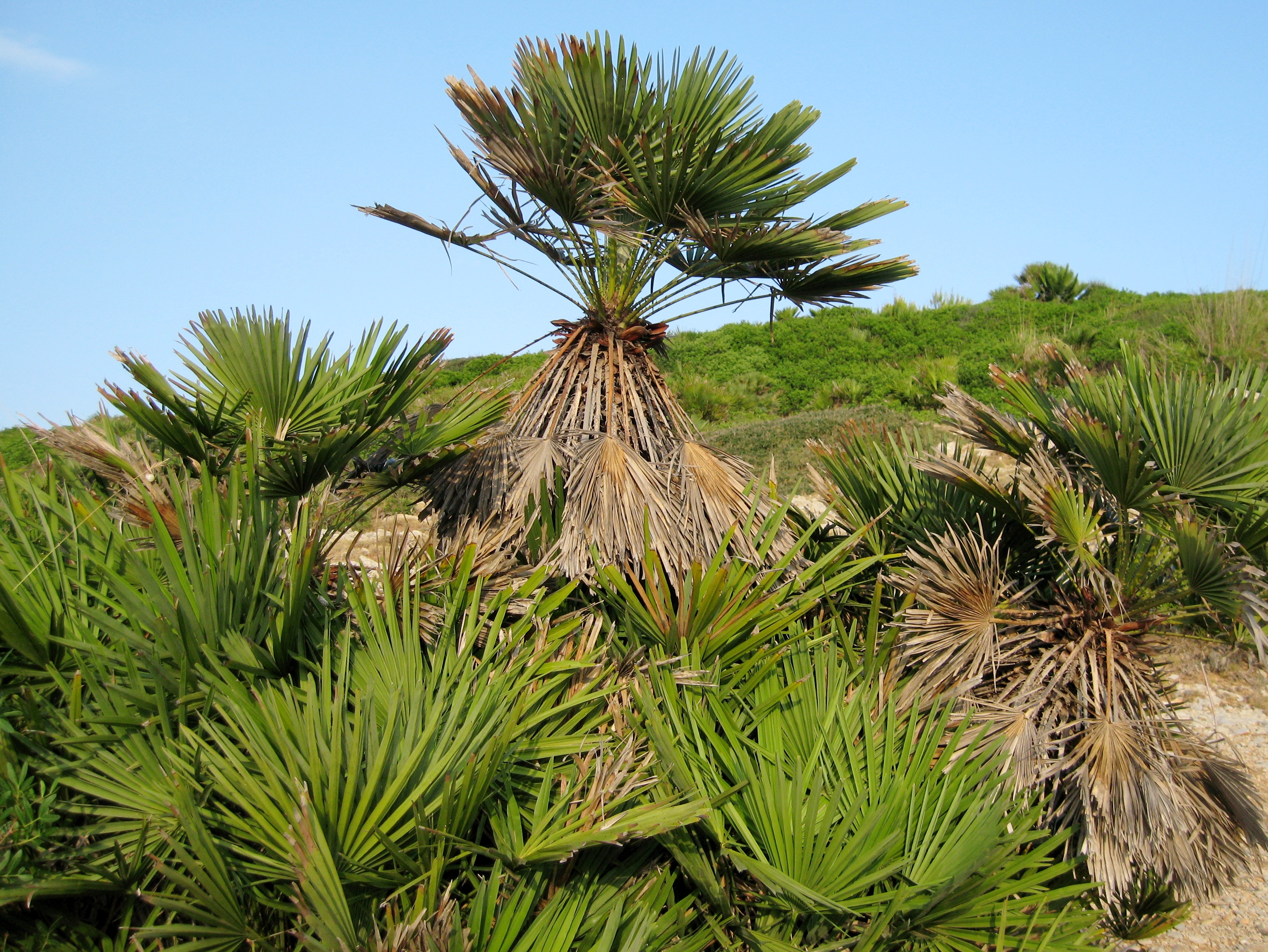
Chamaerops humilis growing in Mallorca

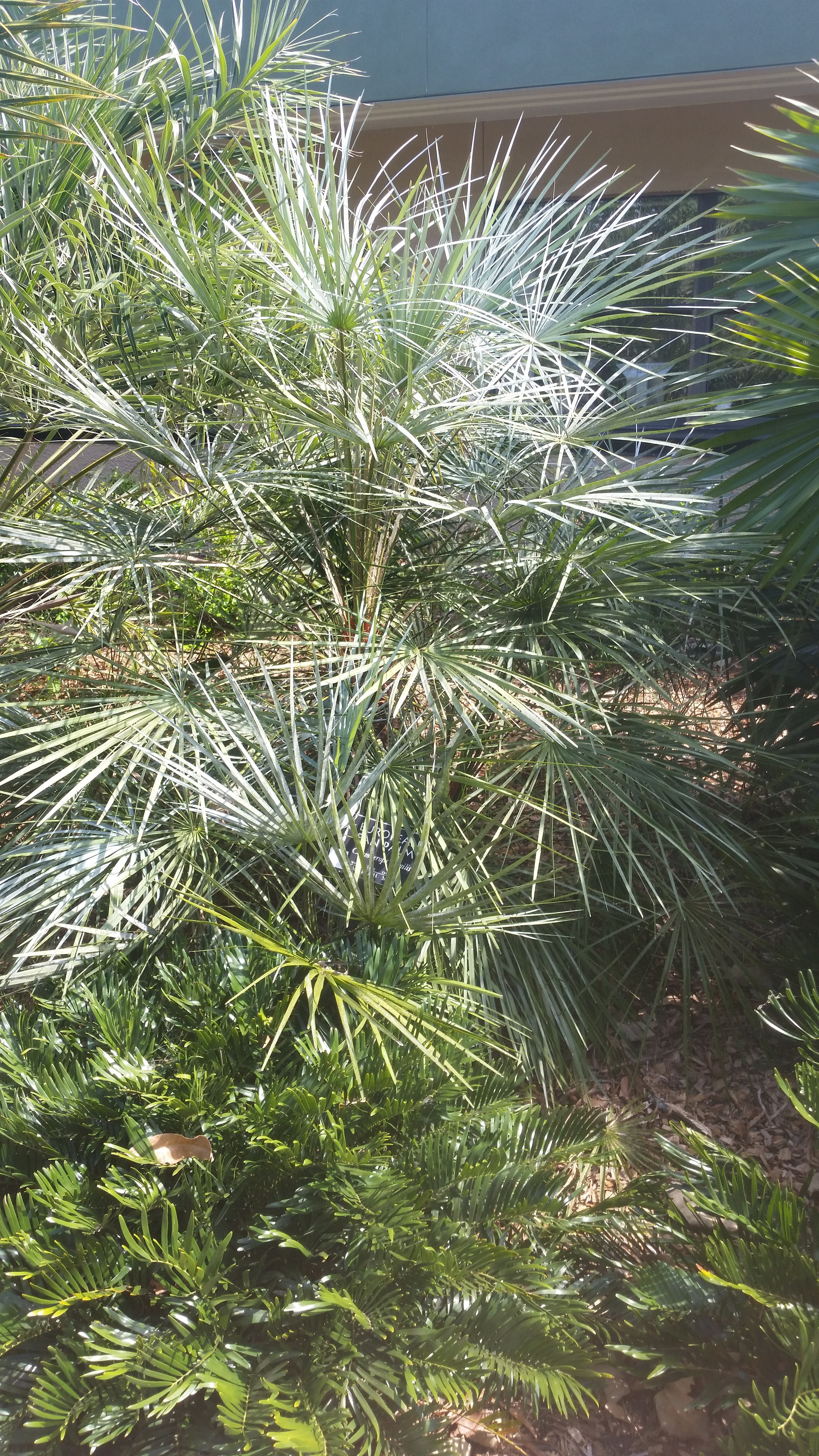
Chamaerops humilis var. argentea in Largo, Florida

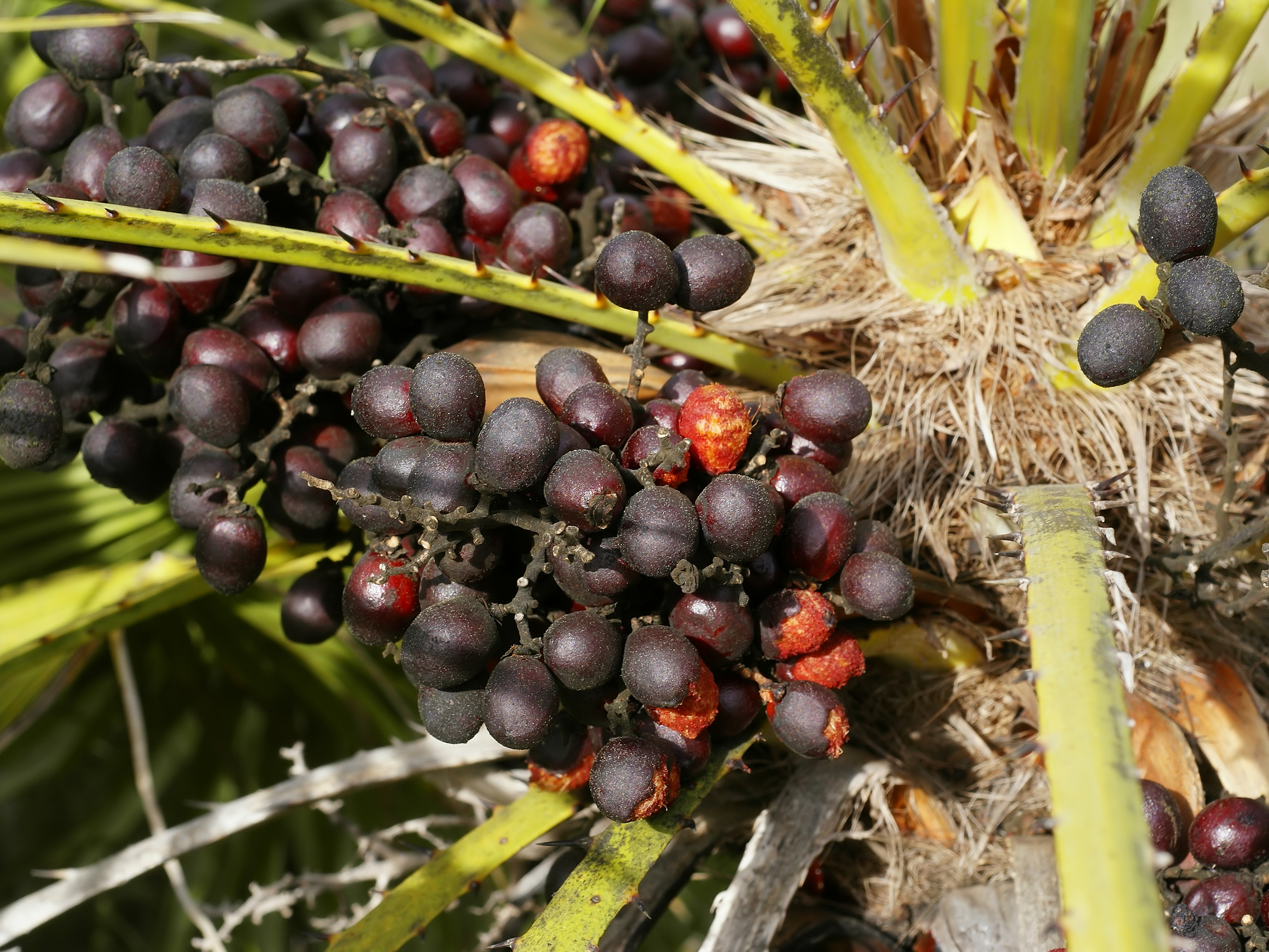
Mature fruit, close-up

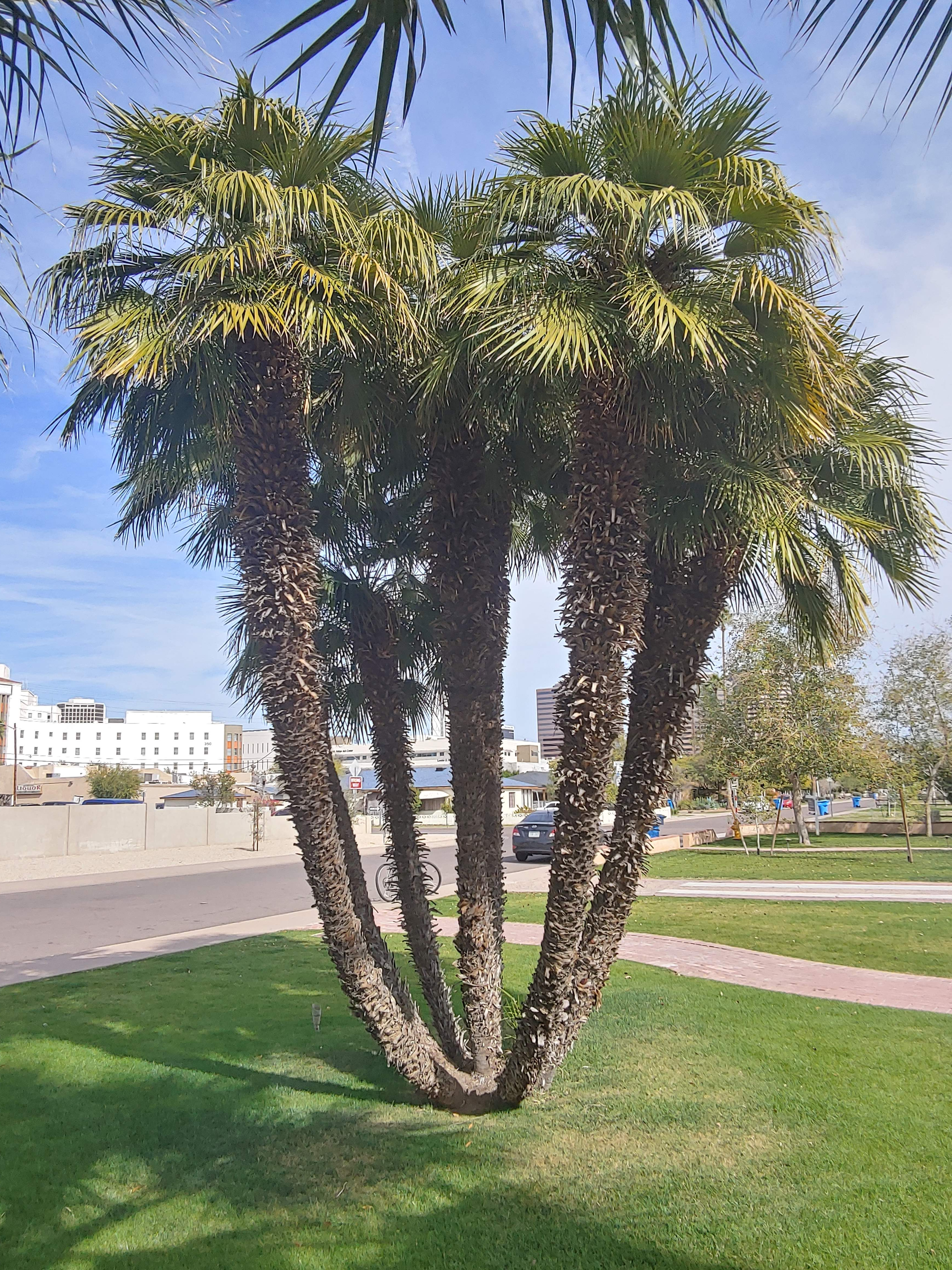
Very old clump of Chamaerops humilis in Phoenix, Arizona

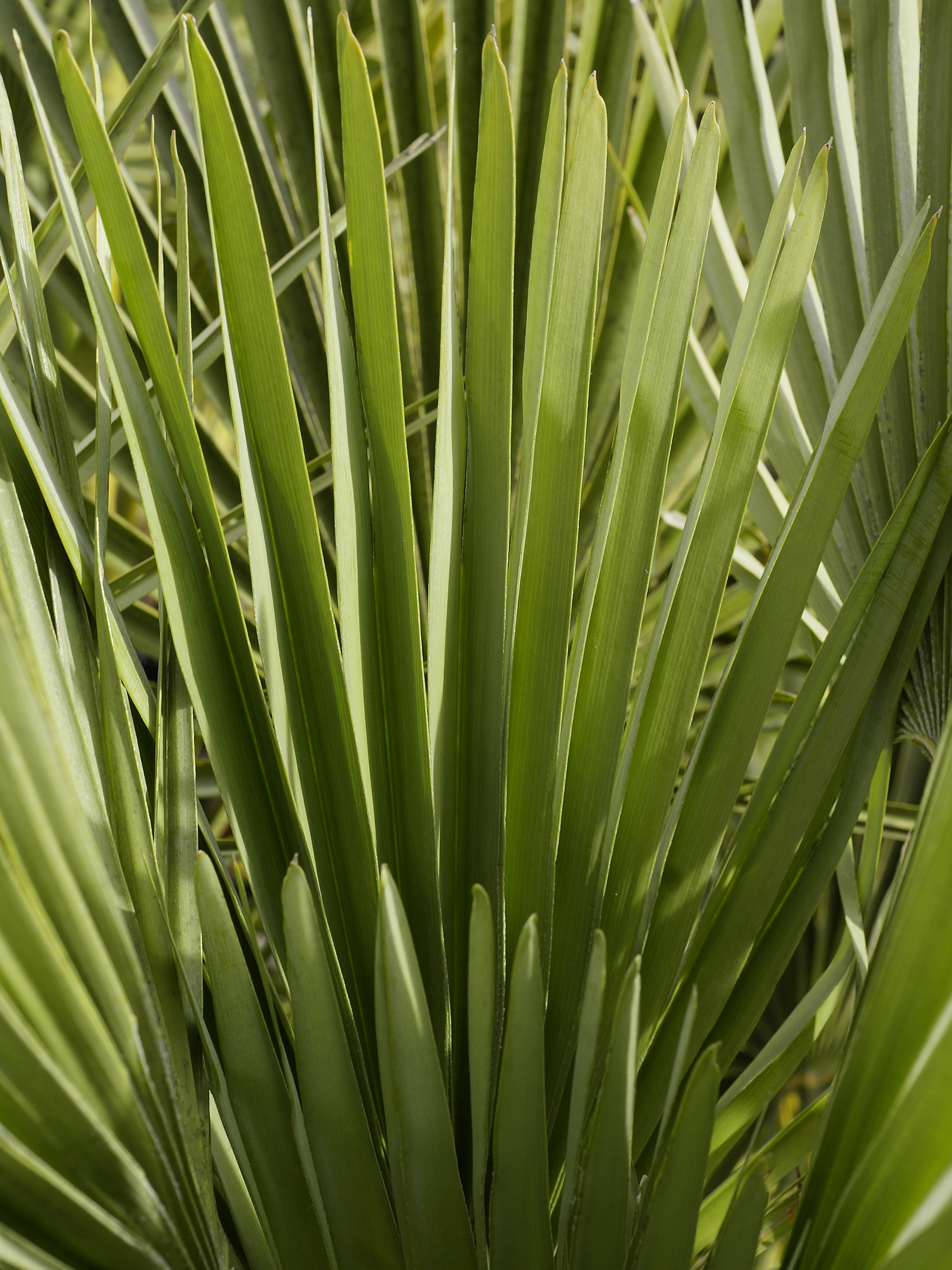
Frond

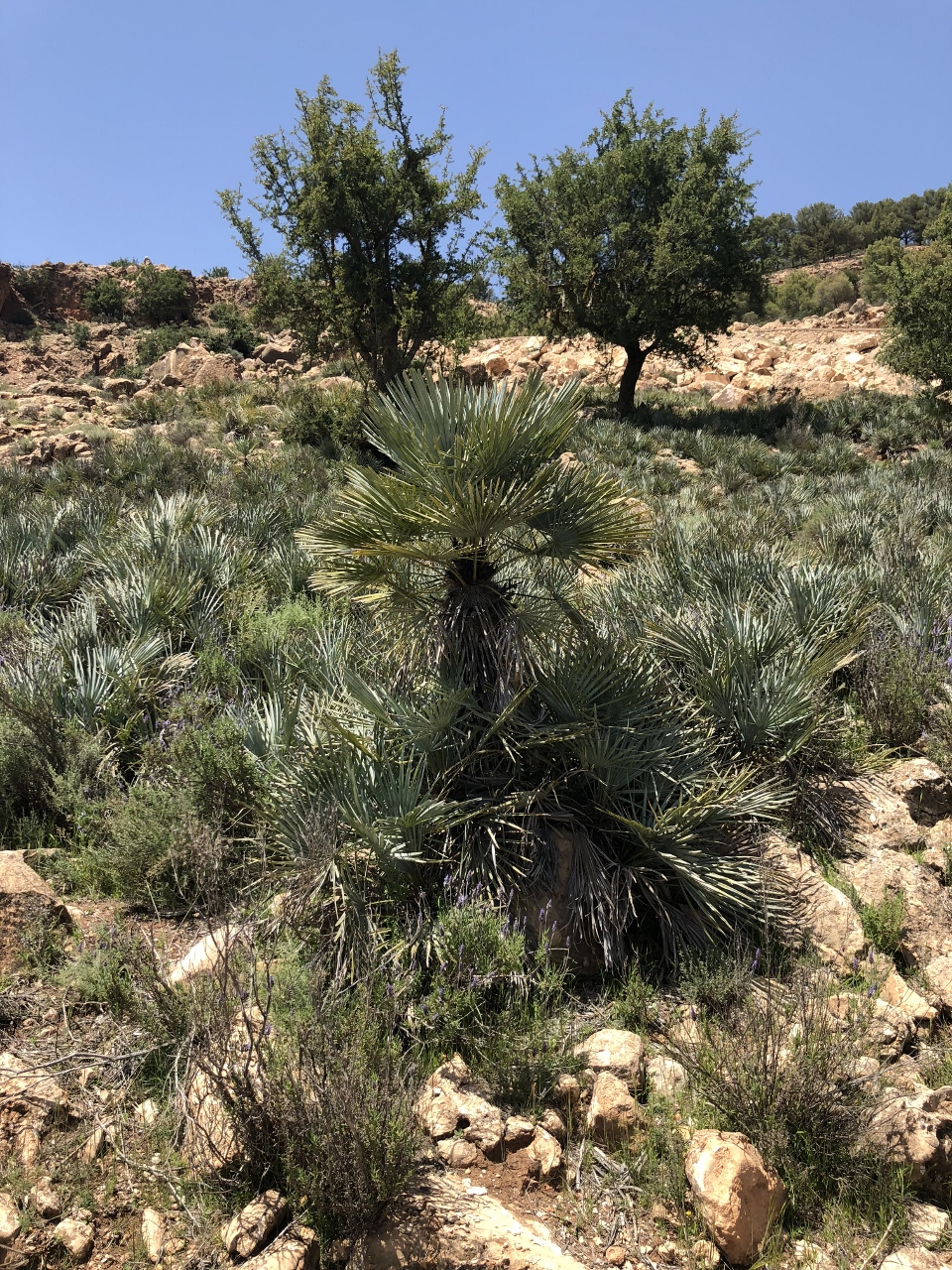
Chamaerops humilis var. argentea in the High Atlas Mountains
