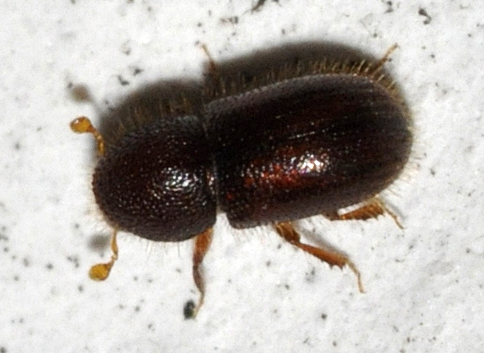

Scientific classification
- Kingdom: Animalia
- Phylum: Arthropoda
- Clade: Pancrustacea
- Class: Insecta
- Order: Coleoptera
- Suborder: Polyphaga
- Infraorder: Cucujiformia
- Superfamily: Curculionoidea
- Family: Curculionidae
- Genus: Coccotrypes
- Species: C. cyperi

Binomial name
- Coccotrypes cyperi (Beeson 1929) Wood & Bright, 1992

Synonyms
- Thamnurgides cyperi Beeson 1929; Xyleborus conspeciens Schedl 1936; Thamnurgides indicus Eggers 1936; Coccotrypes insularis (Eggers 1940); Dryocoetes insularis Eggers 1940; Coccotrypes subdepressus Eggers 1940; Dryocoetes subimpresus Eggers 1940; Poecilips subaplanatus Schedl 1942; Poecilips carabaicus Schedl 1952. Schedl 1952; Poecilips eggersi Schedl 1952. Schedl 1952; Poecilips pilifrons Browne 1970

= Coccotrypes cyperi =

Species of beetle

Coccotrypes cyperi, commonly known as seed borer, is a species of weevil with a cosmopolitan distribution.

== Distribution ==
Native range of the species is South east Asia. It is found in Myanmar, India, China, Indonesia, Malaysia, Sri Lanka, Vietnam, Sweden, Seychelles, Costa Rica, Honduras, Panamá, Jamaica, Lesser Antilles, Puerto Rico, Dominican Republic, México, United States, Australia, Cook Islands, Fiji, French Polynesia, Micronesia, Samoa, Tonga, New Zealand, Papua New Guinea, Bolivia, Brazil, Ecuador, Chile, Peru, Saint Vicente and the Grenadines, Saint Lucia, US Virgin Islands, Suriname and Trinidad and Tobago.

It is introduced to USA in the early 1900s particularly due to imported bird seeds and avocado seeds.

== Biology ==
After mating, adult beetle breeds in fruits, seeds, petioles, phloem, twigs, under bark of branches and logs. Particularly a seed borer, grubs are bore into the soft tissues. Both adults and the larvae are polyphagous and have been reported from about 50 host plant species. In 2013 and 2015, it has been intercepted, in Cyprus on plants for planting of Ficus microcarpa from China.

== Host plants ==
- Aesculus punchuana
- Aglaia spectabilis
- Apeiba tibourbou
- Artocarpus lacucha
- Attalea vitrivir
- Bombax ceiba
- Borassus flabellifer
- Calophyllum inophyllum
- Calophyllum calaba
- Canarium strictum
- Carallia brachiata
- Cassia arabica
- Cecropia insignis
- Cecropia obtusifolia
- Cecropia peltata
- Ceiba pentandra
- Coffea
- Cynometra hemitomophylla
- Dipterocarpus retusus
- Elaeocarpus oblongus
- Eschweilera biflava
- Eugenia formosa
- Euterpe oleracea
- Ficus glomerata
- Ficus retusa
- Gluta travancorica
- Gustavia brachycarpa
- Lonchocarpus macrophyllus
- Luehea seemannii
- Macadamia indica
- Macaranga denticulata
- Mammea americana
- Mangifera indica
- Myrica gale
- Oenocarpus bataua
- Pentadesma butyracea
- Persea americana
- Phytelephas macrocarpa
- Pinus caribaea
- Pinus kesiya
- Pouteria multiflora
- Pronia copaifer
- Rhizophora mangle
- Sandoricum koetjape
- Scheelea bassleriana
- Sloanea berteroana
- Spondias mombin
- Swietenia macrophylla
- Swintonia floribunda
- Terminalia myriocarpa
- Theobroma cacao
- Vateria indica
- Xylia xylocarpa
