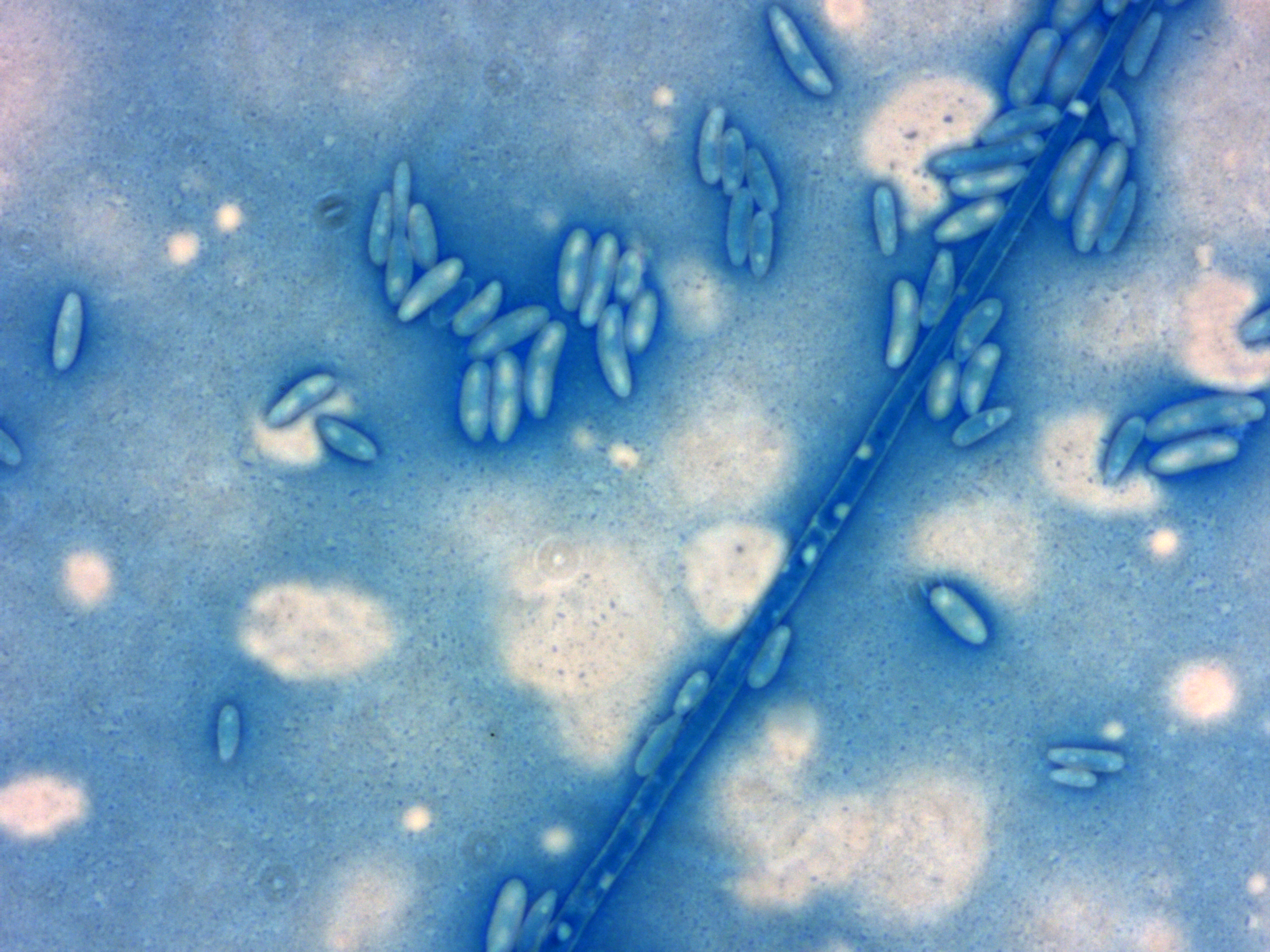
- Microconidia of Fusarium oxysporum f. sp. albedinis staining: lactophenol cotton blue Host: Phoenix dactylifera

Scientific classification
- Domain: Eukaryota
- Kingdom: Fungi
- Division: Ascomycota
- Class: Sordariomycetes
- Order: Hypocreales
- Family: Nectriaceae
- Genus: Fusarium
- Species: F. oxysporum
- Forma specialis: F. o. f.sp. albedinis

Trionomial name
- Fusarium oxysporum f.sp. albedinis W.L. Gordon, (1965)

Synonyms
- Cylindrophora albedinis Kill. & Maire, (1930); Fusarium albedinis (Kill. & Maire) Malençon, (1934); Fusarium oxysporum var. albedinis (Kill. & Maire) Malençon, (1950)

= Fusarium oxysporum f.sp. albedinis =

Fungal date palm pathogen

Fusarium oxysporum f.sp. albedinis is a fungal plant pathogen that causes a disease known as Bayoud disease or fusarium wilt primarily on date palm.

== Genome ==
Fernandez et al., 1998 identify the Fot1 (F.o. transposable elements) in F.o. albedinis.

== Detection ==
F.o. albedinis may be diagnosed by molecular tests targeting sequences found by Fernandez et al., 1998.

== See also ==
- List of date palm diseases
