= Coccotrypes flavicornis =

Scientific classification
- Kingdom: Animalia
- Phylum: Arthropoda
- Class: Insecta
- Order: Coleoptera
- Suborder: Polyphaga
- Infraorder: Cucujiformia
- Family: Curculionidae
- Genus: Coccotrypes
- Species: C. flavicornis

Binomial name
- Coccotrypes flavicornis (Blandford, 1895)

Synonyms
- Dryocoetes flavicornis Blandford, 1895; Dryocoetiops flavicornis (Blandford): Wood & Bright, 1992

Species of beetle

Coccotrypes flavicornis, is a species of weevil found in Sri Lanka.
