= Coccotrypes distinctus =

Scientific classification
- Domain: Eukaryota
- Kingdom: Animalia
- Phylum: Arthropoda
- Class: Insecta
- Order: Coleoptera
- Suborder: Polyphaga
- Infraorder: Cucujiformia
- Family: Curculionidae
- Genus: Coccotrypes
- Species: C. distinctus

Binomial name
- Coccotrypes distinctus (Motschulsky, 1866)

Species of beetle

Coccotrypes distinctus is a species of typical bark beetle in the family Curculionidae. It is known from Sri Lanka, Pacific Islands from New Guinea to Hawaii, southern USA, Honduras, Puerto Rico and Jamaica to Suriname and Guiana.
