= Bayoud disease =

Epiphytic fungal disease

- Common names: fusarium wilt of date palm tracheomycosis of date palm
- Causal agents: Fusarium oxysporum f.sp. albedinis
- Hosts: date palm
- EPPO Code: FUSSAL
- Distribution: Morocco and western Algeria
- Treatment: new cultivars resistant to the disease

Bayoud disease is an epiphytic fungal disease of date palm. The pathogen responsible for the disease is Fusarium oxysporum f.sp. albedinis.

The disease was first reported from Morocco in 1870. The word "bayoud" is derived from the Arabic abiadh ("white"), and is a reference to the whitish discoloration of diseased fronds.
