= Sloanea macbrydei =

- Leaves and fruit

Conservation status
- Least Concern (IUCN 3.1)

Scientific classification
- Kingdom: Plantae
- Clade: Tracheophytes
- Clade: Angiosperms
- Clade: Eudicots
- Clade: Rosids
- Order: Oxalidales
- Family: Elaeocarpaceae
- Genus: Sloanea
- Species: S. macbrydei

Binomial name
- Sloanea macbrydei F.Muell.

Synonyms
- Echinocarpus macbrydei F.Muell.

Species of flowering plant

Sloanea macbrydei, commonly known as grey carabeen, is a species of plant in the family Elaeocarpaceae. It is a large tree native to rainforest of the east coast and adjacent ranges of Queensland, Australia. It was first described by Ferdinand von Mueller in 1868, based on material collected by John Dallachy, and was named in honour of Dallachy's assistant John MacBryde.

== Conservation ==
This species was assessed by the International Union for Conservation of Nature (IUCN) in 2023 and found to be of least concern. It is also rated as least concern by the Queensland Government under its Nature Conservation Act.
