= Climax species =

Plant species that can germinate and grow with limited resources

An image of ecological succession, starting with pioneer species and ending with an old-growth forest that is dominated by climax species, which is denoted by VIII.

Climax species, also called late seral, late-successional, K-selected or equilibrium species, are plant species that can germinate and grow with limited resources; e.g., they need heat exposure or low water availability. They are the species within forest succession that are more adapted to stable and predictable environments, and will remain essentially unchanged in terms of species composition for as long as a site remains undisturbed.

The seedlings of climax species can grow in the shade of the parent trees, ensuring their dominance indefinitely. The presence of climax species can also reduce the prevalence of other species within an ecosystem. However, a disturbance, such as fire, may kill the climax species, allowing pioneer or earlier successional species to re-establish for a time. They are the opposite of pioneer species, also known as ruderal, fugitive, opportunistic or R-selected species, in the sense that climax species are good competitors but poor colonizers, whereas pioneer species are good colonizers but poor competitors.

Given the prevailing ecological conditions, climax species dominate the climax community. When the pace of succession slows down as a result of ecological homeostasis, the maximum permitted biodiversity is reached. Their reproductive strategies and other adaptive characteristics can be considered more sophisticated than those of opportunistic species.

Through negative feedback, they adapt themselves to specific environmental conditions. Climax species are mostly found in forests. Climax species, closely controlled by carrying capacity, follow K strategies, wherein species produce fewer numbers of potential offspring, but invest more heavily in securing the reproductive success of each one to the micro-environmental conditions of its specific ecological niche. Climax species might be iteroparous, energy consumption efficient and nutrient cycling.

== Disputed term ==
The idea of a climax species has been criticized in recent ecological literature. Any assessment of successional states depends on assumptions about the natural fire regime. But the idea of a dominant species is still widely used in silvicultural programs and California Department of Forestry literature.

== Examples ==
White spruce (Picea glauca) is an example of a climax species in the northern forests of North America due to its ability to adapt to resource-scarce, stable conditions, it dominates Northern forest ecosystems in the absence of a disturbance.

Other examples of climax species in old-growth forests:

- Canadian hemlock
- Pacific silver fir
- White fir
- Yellow carabeen
- Blue grama
- Douglas fir
- Coast redwood
- European beech

== See also ==
- Climax vegetation
