= Sloanea assamica =

Conservation status
- Least Concern (IUCN 2.3)

Scientific classification
- Kingdom: Plantae
- Clade: Tracheophytes
- Clade: Angiosperms
- Clade: Eudicots
- Clade: Rosids
- Order: Oxalidales
- Family: Elaeocarpaceae
- Genus: Sloanea
- Species: S. assamica

Binomial name
- Sloanea assamica Rehder & E. Wilson

Species of flowering plant

Sloanea assamica is a species of plant in the Elaeocarpaceae family. It is found in Bhutan, China, India, and Myanmar.
