= Coccotrypes carpophagus =

Scientific classification
- Kingdom: Animalia
- Phylum: Arthropoda
- Clade: Pancrustacea
- Class: Insecta
- Order: Coleoptera
- Suborder: Polyphaga
- Infraorder: Cucujiformia
- Family: Curculionidae
- Genus: Coccotrypes
- Species: C. carpophagus

Binomial name
- Coccotrypes carpophagus (Hornung, 1842)

Species of beetle

Coccotrypes carpophagus is a species of typical bark beetle in the family Curculionidae.

It is native to Africa but is now widely distributed in Asia, Australia, North America, Central America and South America.
