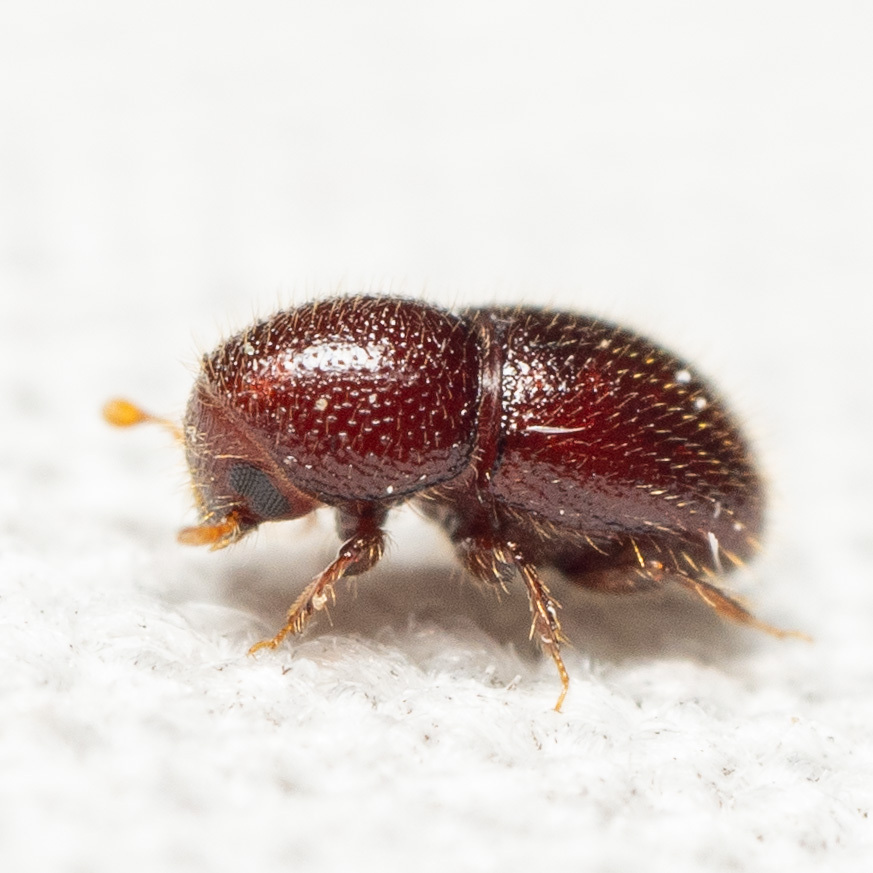
- Coccotrypes distinctus, Texas

Scientific classification
- Kingdom: Animalia
- Phylum: Arthropoda
- Clade: Pancrustacea
- Class: Insecta
- Order: Coleoptera
- Suborder: Polyphaga
- Infraorder: Cucujiformia
- Superfamily: Curculionoidea
- Family: Curculionidae
- Subfamily: Scolytinae
- Tribe: Scolytini
- Genus: Coccotrypes; Eichhoff, 1878

= Coccotrypes =

Genus of beetles

Coccotrypes is a genus of palm seed borers in the beetle family Curculionidae. There are more than 170 described species in Coccotrypes, found in warmer climates of all continents except Antarctica.

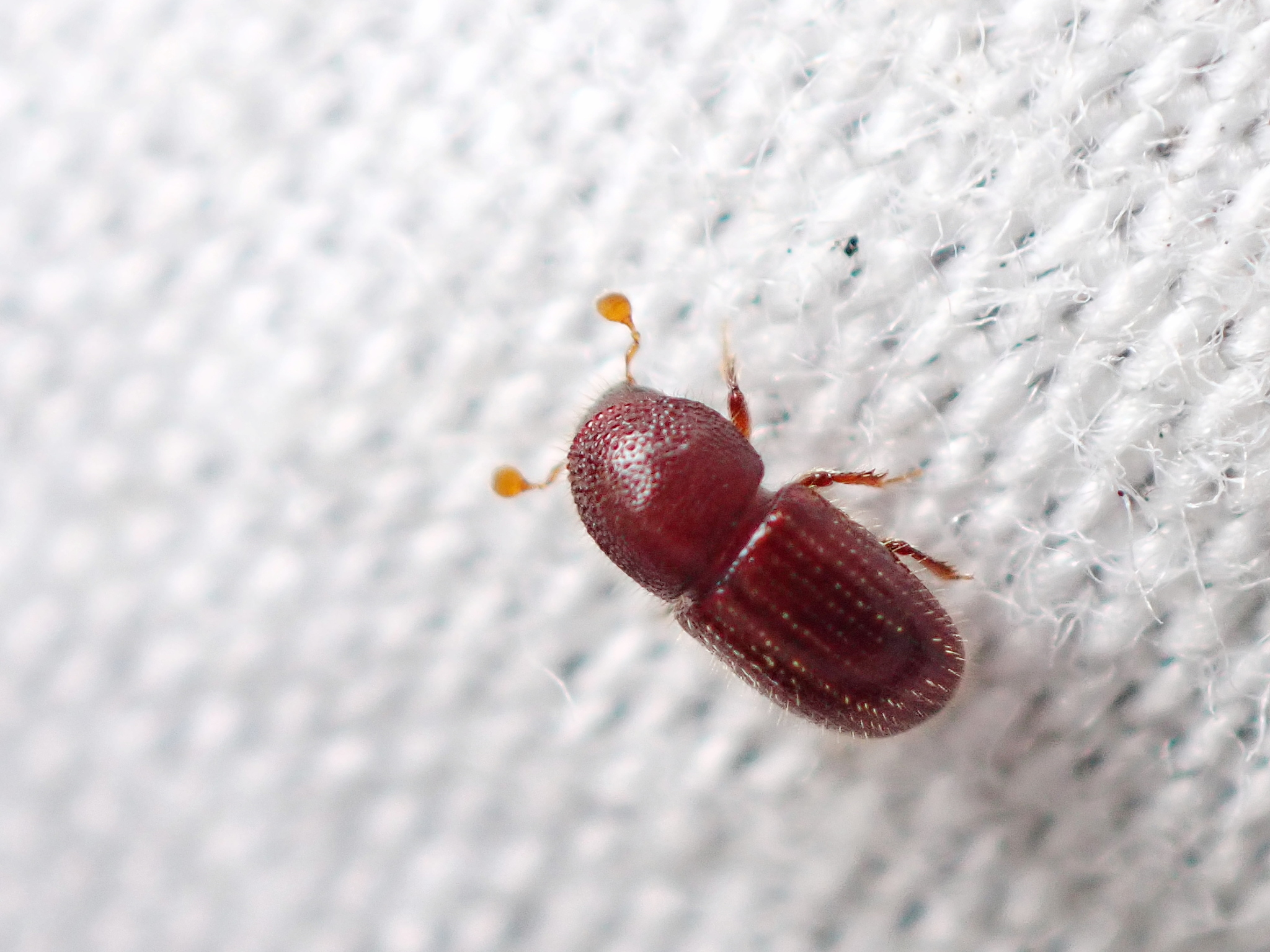
Coccotrypes dactyliperda, New Zealand

== Species ==
These 177 species belong to the genus Coccotrypes:

- Coccotrypes abruptulus Wood & Bright, 1992
- Coccotrypes abruptus Wood & Bright, 1992
- Coccotrypes aciculatus Schedl, 1952
- Coccotrypes advena Blandford, 1894
- Coccotrypes alternatus Wood & Bright, 1992
- Coccotrypes amplipunctatus Bright, 2000
- Coccotrypes anonae Hopkins, 1915
- Coccotrypes apicatus Schedl (Beeson in), 1972
- Coccotrypes areccae Schedl (Eggers in), 1950
- Coccotrypes asper Wood & Bright, 1992
- Coccotrypes aspericollis Wood & Bright, 1992
- Coccotrypes babai Wood & Bright, 1992
- Coccotrypes bakeri Hopkins, 1915
- Coccotrypes barbatus Wood & Bright, 1992
- Coccotrypes bassiavorus Hopkins, 1915
- Coccotrypes bicolor Sampson, 1914
- Coccotrypes birmanus Eggers, 1939
- Coccotrypes borassi Beeson, 1939
- Coccotrypes borneensis Wood & Bright, 1992
- Coccotrypes brevipilosus Eggers, 1951
- Coccotrypes brevis Schedl (Eggers in), 1961
- Coccotrypes brunneus Wood & Bright, 1992
- Coccotrypes brunnipes Wood, 1989
- Coccotrypes campnospermae Wood & Bright, 1992
- Coccotrypes canariensis Eggers, 1928
- Coccotrypes cardamomi Schaufuss, C.F.C., 1905
- Coccotrypes carinensis Wood & Bright, 1992
- Coccotrypes carpophagus Wood & Bright, 1992
- Coccotrypes ceylonicus Schedl, 1948
- Coccotrypes chimbui Wood & Bright, 1992
- Coccotrypes cinnamomi Wood & Bright, 1992
- Coccotrypes circumdatus Fonseca, 1930
- Coccotrypes collaris Wood & Bright, 1992
- Coccotrypes confertus Wood & Bright, 1992
- Coccotrypes confusus Wood & Bright, 1992
- Coccotrypes congonus Eggers, 1924
- Coccotrypes corpulentus Browne, 1970
- Coccotrypes crassiventris Wood & Bright, 1992
- Coccotrypes creber Wood & Bright, 1992
- Coccotrypes curtus Schedl, 1938
- Coccotrypes cylindricus Schedl, 1948
- Coccotrypes cyperi Wood & Bright, 1992
- Coccotrypes dactyliperda (Fabricius, J.C., 1802) (palm seed borer)
- Coccotrypes declivis Sampson, 1914
- Coccotrypes depressus Wood & Bright, 1992
- Coccotrypes distinctus Wood & Bright, 1992
- Coccotrypes duplopilosus Wood & Bright, 1992
- Coccotrypes eggersi Hagedorn, 1904
- Coccotrypes elaeocarpi Beeson, 1939
- Coccotrypes elongatulus Wood & Bright, 1992
- Coccotrypes elongatus Wood & Bright, 1992
- Coccotrypes exasperatus Schedl, 1975
- Coccotrypes excavatus Schedl, 1948
- Coccotrypes fagi Wood & Bright, 1992
- Coccotrypes fallax Wood & Bright, 1992
- Coccotrypes fijianus Wood & Bright, 1992
- Coccotrypes flavicornis (Blandford, 1895) Beaver, Smith, & Sanguansub 2019
- Coccotrypes floridensis Schedl, 1948
- Coccotrypes fulgens Wood & Bright, 1992
- Coccotrypes furvus Wood & Bright, 1992
- Coccotrypes gedeanus Wood & Bright, 1992
- Coccotrypes ghesquierei Eggers, 1927
- Coccotrypes grandis Wood & Bright, 1992
- Coccotrypes graniceps Browne, 1970
- Coccotrypes grisseopuberulus Schedl, 1972
- Coccotrypes hagedorni Eggers, 1908
- Coccotrypes hubbardi Hopkins, 1915
- Coccotrypes impressostriatus Bright, 2000
- Coccotrypes impressus Eggers, 1936
- Coccotrypes incertus Bright, 2019
- Coccotrypes incognitus Wood & Bright, 1992
- Coccotrypes insularis Eggers, 1940
- Coccotrypes insulindicus Schedl (Eggers in), 1954
- Coccotrypes integer Eichhoff, 1878
- Coccotrypes jacobsoni Wood & Bright, 1992
- Coccotrypes japonicus Wood & Bright, 1992
- Coccotrypes klapperichi Wood & Bright, 1992
- Coccotrypes kuscheli Schedl, 1979
- Coccotrypes laboulbenei Decaux, 1890
- Coccotrypes laevicollis Wood & Bright, 1992
- Coccotrypes laticollis Wood & Bright, 1992
- Coccotrypes leveri Browne, 1970
- Coccotrypes liberiensis Hopkins, 1915
- Coccotrypes limbatideclivis Bright, 2000
- Coccotrypes litoralis Wood & Bright, 1992
- Coccotrypes longicollis Wood & Bright, 1992
- Coccotrypes longior Wood & Bright, 1992
- Coccotrypes luzonicus Wood & Bright, 1992
- Coccotrypes magnus Beeson, 1939
- Coccotrypes malgasicus Wood & Bright, 1992
- Coccotrypes marginatus Wood & Bright, 1992
- Coccotrypes medius Wood & Bright, 1992
- Coccotrypes minimus Wood & Bright, 1992
- Coccotrypes minutissimus Wood & Bright, 1992
- Coccotrypes minutus Schedl, 1975
- Coccotrypes mjoebergi Wood & Bright, 1992
- Coccotrypes monoceros Wood & Bright, 1992
- Coccotrypes moreirai Eggers, 1928
- Coccotrypes morokensis Wood & Bright, 1992
- Coccotrypes myristicae Wood & Bright, 1992
- Coccotrypes naidaijinensis Wood & Bright, 1992
- Coccotrypes nanus Eggers, 1920
- Coccotrypes niger Eggers, 1927
- Coccotrypes nigripes Eggers, 1924
- Coccotrypes nigronitens Wood & Bright, 1992
- Coccotrypes nitidus Wood & Bright, 1992
- Coccotrypes norimasanus Wood & Bright, 1992
- Coccotrypes nubilus Wood & Bright, 1992
- Coccotrypes obscurus Rey, 1892
- Coccotrypes obtusicollis Wood & Bright, 1992
- Coccotrypes omissus Schedl, 1979
- Coccotrypes palmarum Eggers, 1933
- Coccotrypes papuanus Wood & Bright, 1992
- Coccotrypes parvus Sampson, 1914
- Coccotrypes perditor Blandford, 1894
- Coccotrypes petioli Wood & Bright, 1992
- Coccotrypes philippinensis Schedl, 1933
- Coccotrypes phoenicola Beeson, 1939
- Coccotrypes pilosulus Schedl, 1948
- Coccotrypes politus Wood & Bright, 1992
- Coccotrypes precarius Bright, 2019
- Coccotrypes priesneri Schedl, 1950
- Coccotrypes pterydophytae Wood & Bright, 1992
- Coccotrypes pubescens Schedl, 1948
- Coccotrypes punctatus Wood & Bright, 1992
- Coccotrypes punctulatus Eggers, 1951
- Coccotrypes pygmaeus Eichhoff, 1878
- Coccotrypes queenslandi Wood & Bright, 1992
- Coccotrypes recticollis Wood & Bright, 1992
- Coccotrypes regularis Wood & Bright, 1992
- Coccotrypes rhizophorae Wood & Bright, 1992
- Coccotrypes robustulus Wood, 1989
- Coccotrypes robustus Eichhoff, 1878
- Coccotrypes rolliniae Hopkins, 1915
- Coccotrypes rotundicollis Wood & Bright, 1992
- Coccotrypes rugicollis Wood & Bright, 1992
- Coccotrypes rustchuruensis Eggers, 1940
- Coccotrypes rutschuruensis Eggers, 1940
- Coccotrypes salakensis Wood & Bright, 1992
- Coccotrypes sannio Wood & Bright, 1992
- Coccotrypes sculptilis Wood & Bright, 1992
- Coccotrypes silvestris Schedl (Beeson in), 1972
- Coccotrypes similis Wood & Bright, 1992
- Coccotrypes solomonicus Wood & Bright, 1992
- Coccotrypes sparsepilosus Wood & Bright, 1992
- Coccotrypes sparserugosus Wood & Bright, 1992
- Coccotrypes spinipennis Wood & Bright, 1992
- Coccotrypes squamifer Wood & Bright, 1992
- Coccotrypes striatulus Wood, 1989
- Coccotrypes striatus Eggers, 1920
- Coccotrypes strigicollis Schedl, 1972
- Coccotrypes suaui Wood & Bright, 1992
- Coccotrypes subacuminatus Wood & Bright, 1992
- Coccotrypes subcribrosus Wood & Bright, 1992
- Coccotrypes subcylindricus Wood & Bright, 1992
- Coccotrypes subdepressus Schedl, 1948
- Coccotrypes sublaevis Schedl (Eggers in), 1963
- Coccotrypes suboblongus Schedl (Eggers in), 1960
- Coccotrypes subovalis Eggers, 1932
- Coccotrypes subseriatus Schedl (Eggers in), 1961
- Coccotrypes subsulcatus Schedl, 1962
- Coccotrypes subvulgaris Wood & Bright, 1992
- Coccotrypes sumatranus Schedl (Eggers in), 1966
- Coccotrypes surinamensis Schedl, 1948
- Coccotrypes tahitensis Wood & Bright, 1992
- Coccotrypes tanganus Eggers, 1935
- Coccotrypes tapatapaoanus Wood & Bright, 1992
- Coccotrypes taprobanus Wood & Bright, 1992
- Coccotrypes theae Eggers, 1929
- Coccotrypes thrinacis Hopkins, 1915
- Coccotrypes trevori Beeson, 1939
- Coccotrypes tropicus Eichhoff, 1878
- Coccotrypes tunggali Wood & Bright, 1992
- Coccotrypes uniseriatus Eggers, 1927
- Coccotrypes variabilis Wood & Bright, 1992
- Coccotrypes vateriae Wood & Bright, 1992
- Coccotrypes vulgaris Wood & Bright, 1992
