= Coccotrypes theae =

Scientific classification
- Kingdom: Animalia
- Phylum: Arthropoda
- Class: Insecta
- Order: Coleoptera
- Suborder: Polyphaga
- Infraorder: Cucujiformia
- Family: Curculionidae
- Genus: Coccotrypes
- Species: C. theae

Binomial name
- Coccotrypes theae Eggers, 1929

Species of beetle

Coccotrypes cyperi, is a species of weevil found in Sri Lanka.
