= Coccotrypes advena =

Scientific classification
- Kingdom: Animalia
- Phylum: Arthropoda
- Clade: Pancrustacea
- Class: Insecta
- Order: Coleoptera
- Suborder: Polyphaga
- Infraorder: Cucujiformia
- Family: Curculionidae
- Subfamily: Scolytinae
- Tribe: Scolytini
- Genus: Coccotrypes
- Species: C. advena

Binomial name
- Coccotrypes advena Blandford, 1894

Species of beetle

Coccotrypes advena is a species in the family Curculionidae ("snout and bark beetles"), in the order Coleoptera ("beetles"). A common name for Coccotrypes advena is "seed borer". Coccotrypes advena probably originates from Southeast Asia, but is now found in North America.
