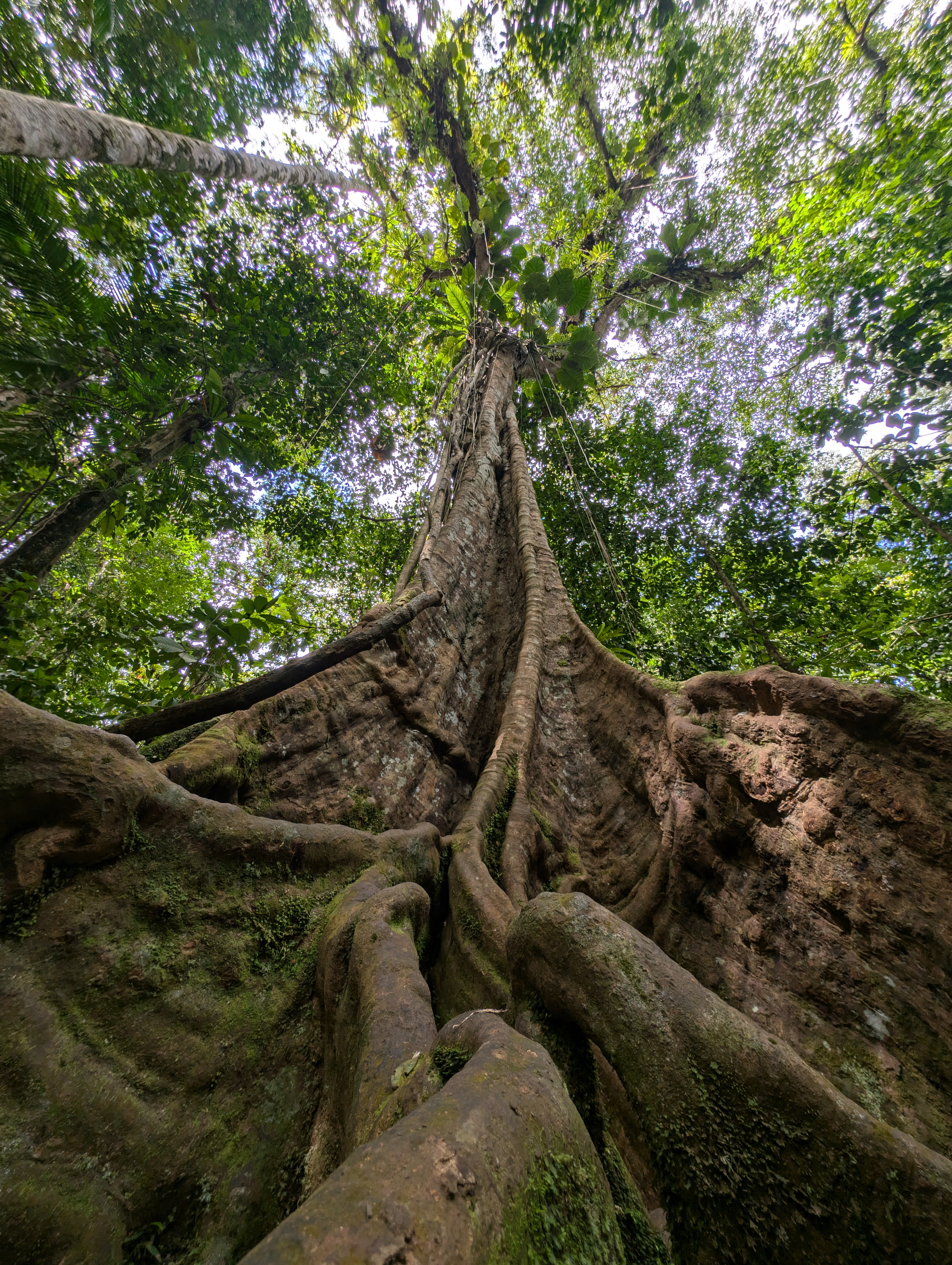
- In Guadeloupe

Scientific classification
- Kingdom: Plantae
- Clade: Embryophytes
- Clade: Tracheophytes
- Clade: Spermatophytes
- Clade: Angiosperms
- Clade: Eudicots
- Clade: Rosids
- Order: Oxalidales
- Family: Elaeocarpaceae
- Genus: Sloanea
- Species: S. caribaea

Binomial name
- Sloanea caribaea Krub & Urban ex Duss

= Sloanea caribaea =

Species of flowering plant

Sloanea caribaea is a tree native to the eastern Caribbean and northern South America. Its local names include acomat boucan (in Guadeloupe and Martinique), chataignier (in Saint Lucia and Saint Vincent), and chatannyé ti-fèy or chataignier 'ti feuille (in Dominica).

== Description ==
Sloanea caribaea is a very large tree, reaching heights of over 40 m (131 ft) tall. Its trunk's diameter can reach up to 2–4.9 m (6.5–16 ft). It has tall and broad buttress roots. Its bark is relatively smooth and brownish in color, and starts to peel off into thin strips over time.

Sloanea caribaea is native to the Leeward Islands, the Windward Islands, Trinidad and Tobago, Colombia, Venezuela, and northern Brazil. It is the most common Sloanea species on Dominica, St. Lucia, St. Vincent, and Grenada.

== Taxonomy ==
The first species description was provided in 1896 (published 1897) by Antoine Duss in Annales de l'Institut Colonial de Marseille, following Karl Wilhelm Leopold Krug and Ignatz Urban. A synonym is Sloanea larensis Steyerm. The genus name Sloanea honors the Irish physician and botanist Hans Sloane.

== Ecology ==
On St. Lucia, Sloanea caribaea are habitats for wildlife such as Antillean fruit-eating bats and other Brachyphylla. On Dominica, the trees provide nesting areas for the Sisserou Parrot (Amazona imperialis) and Jaco Parrot (Amazona arausiaca).
