= Sloanea suaveolens =

Conservation status
- Critically Endangered (IUCN 3.1)

Scientific classification
- Kingdom: Plantae
- Clade: Tracheophytes
- Clade: Angiosperms
- Clade: Eudicots
- Clade: Rosids
- Order: Oxalidales
- Family: Elaeocarpaceae
- Genus: Sloanea
- Species: S. suaveolens

Binomial name
- Sloanea suaveolens Tirel

Species of flowering plant native to New Caledonia

Sloanea suaveolens is a species of plant in the Elaeocarpaceae family. It is endemic to New Caledonia.
