= Omphalia tralucida =

Scientific classification
- Domain: Eukaryota
- Kingdom: Fungi
- Division: Basidiomycota
- Class: Agaricomycetes
- Order: Agaricales
- Family: Tricholomataceae
- Genus: Omphalina
- Species: O. tralucida

Binomial name
- Omphalina tralucida Bliss (1938)

Species of fungus

Omphalia tralucida is a species of fungus in the family Tricholomataceae. First described scientifically by Donald Everett Bliss in 1938, it causes decline disease in the date palm (Phoenix dactylifera).
