= Sloanea acutiflora =

Conservation status
- Vulnerable (IUCN 2.3)

Scientific classification
- Kingdom: Plantae
- Clade: Tracheophytes
- Clade: Angiosperms
- Clade: Eudicots
- Clade: Rosids
- Order: Oxalidales
- Family: Elaeocarpaceae
- Genus: Sloanea
- Species: S. acutiflora

Binomial name
- Sloanea acutiflora Uittien

Species of flowering plant native to Suriname

Sloanea acutiflora is a species of plant in the Elaeocarpaceae family. It is endemic to Suriname.
