= Pestalotiopsis palmarum =

Scientific classification
- Kingdom: Fungi
- Division: Ascomycota
- Class: Sordariomycetes
- Order: Amphisphaeriales
- Family: Sporocadaceae
- Genus: Pestalotiopsis
- Species: P. palmarum

Binomial name
- Pestalotiopsis palmarum (Cooke) Steyaert, (1949)

Synonyms
- Disease of Palm Cooke, (1876)

Species of fungus

Pestalotiopsis palmarum is the causative agent of a fungal disease of bananas, coconut and Date palms . The fungus causes leaf spots, petiole/rachis blights and sometimes bud rot of palms. Unlike other leaf spot and blight diseases, Pestalotiopsis palmarun attacks all parts of the leaf from the base to the tip. Whereas most diseases only infect the leaf blade or the leaf petiole.

== Host ==
The fungus has been isolated from a wide variety of palm tissue. The fungus is not host specific so the disease could be present in many more types of palm, but further research needs to be done. The fungus has also been known to infect pygmy date palm (Phoenix roebelenii) and has been a big problem in Florida during the winter months. Some varieties of bananas have also shown symptoms of the disease, but it is unclear if it is in fact Pestalotiopsis palmarum.

== Symptoms ==
It has been shown that the fungus usually requires wounds to infect the plant and necessary for the fungus to develop. The first symptoms of Pestalotiopsis palmarum begin as very small yellow, brown or black discoloration of the leaves. The disease can be restricted to the leaf blade or may only appear on the petiole and rachis right away. Spots and discoloration areas can be smaller than 0.25 inches (6.4 mm) in size, but under optimal conditions can grow much larger eventually forming lesions. The spots will often turn a grayish color and will be outlined in black. Extreme wilting and a drying appearance on the leaves is also a major symptom of Pestalotiopsis palm.

In mature palms, if the fungus is limited to only leaf spots, the disease may not be very serious and damaging. However, the fungus can severely affect juvenile plants if only a few leaf spots are present because they have yet to develop a trunk and only have a few leaves.

== Management ==
Wind and water movement easily disperses spores of Pestalotiopsis palmarum so sanitation and irrigation management can be proven to be critical in preventing the movement of the disease. Wounds and damage to the plant offer easy access for the fungus so the limitation of human and insect activity can be very beneficial. Limiting the length of time that the leaves are wet when exposed to high humidity levels also reduces the risk of inoculation. So eliminating overhead irrigation can prevent infection on leaves when there is favorable humid weather. Nutrient management is also very important in controlling Pestalotopsis palmarum. Nutrient deficiencies can cause chlorosis and necrosis of leaf tissue which then in turn creates a wound necessary for disease inoculation.

Based on the amount of disease on the leaves, pruning the leaves may treat the disease, but one needs to decide if pruning the leaves is worth the nutrient deficiency that could follow depending on the growth stage of the plant. Fungicides are also available for managing the disease, but alone will not solve the problem. Fungicides will prevent infection of healthy leaves, but infected leaves will stay infected until the leaf dies. Using multiple techniques for managing Pestalotiopsis palmarum at the same time is recommended for optimal management of the disease.
