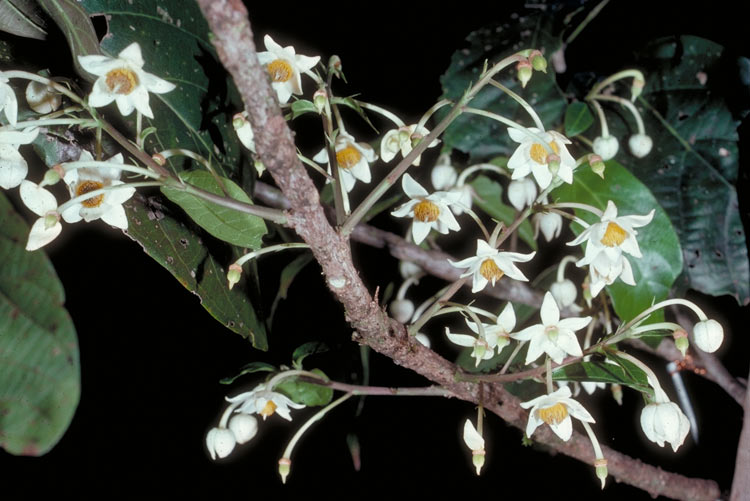
- Flowers

Conservation status
- Least Concern (IUCN 3.1)

Scientific classification
- Kingdom: Plantae
- Clade: Tracheophytes
- Clade: Angiosperms
- Clade: Eudicots
- Clade: Rosids
- Order: Oxalidales
- Family: Elaeocarpaceae
- Genus: Sloanea
- Species: S. langii

Binomial name
- Sloanea langii F.Muell.

Synonyms
- Echinocarpus langii F.Muell.

= Sloanea langii =

White carabeen

Species of flowering plant

Sloanea langii, commonly known as the white carabeen, is a species of plant in the family Elaeocarpaceae found only in the state of Queensland, Australia. It is a large tree up to 35 m (115 ft) tall with large buttress roots. The leaves are generally about 6–14 cm (2.4–5.5 in) long and 3–6 cm (1.2–2.4 in) wide, and held on a petiole up to 4 cm (1.6 in) long. Flowers have four white sepals and four white petals, about 50–90 stamens, and an ovary that is about 3 mm (0.12 in) long. The dehiscent fruit have 3 or 4 valves with generally one seed per valve. They are bronze/yellow and densely covered in bristles.

== Taxonomy ==
This species was first described by Ferdinand von Mueller in 1865.

== Conservation ==
This species has been assessed to be of least concern by the International Union for Conservation of Nature (IUCN) and by the Queensland Government under its Nature Conservation Act.
