= Sloanea tomentosa =

Conservation status
- Least Concern (IUCN 2.3)

Scientific classification
- Kingdom: Plantae
- Clade: Tracheophytes
- Clade: Angiosperms
- Clade: Eudicots
- Clade: Rosids
- Order: Oxalidales
- Family: Elaeocarpaceae
- Genus: Sloanea
- Species: S. tomentosa

Binomial name
- Sloanea tomentosa Rehder & E. Wilson

Species of flowering plant found in Asia

Sloanea tomentosa is a species of plant in the Elaeocarpaceae family. It is found in Bhutan, China, India, Myanmar, Nepal, and Thailand.
