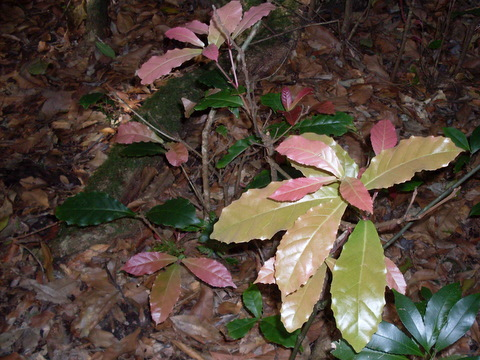
- Juvenile maiden's blush growing by the Hacking River, Australia

Scientific classification
- Kingdom: Plantae
- Clade: Tracheophytes
- Clade: Angiosperms
- Clade: Eudicots
- Clade: Rosids
- Order: Oxalidales
- Family: Elaeocarpaceae
- Genus: Sloanea
- Species: S. australis

Binomial name
- Sloanea australis Benth. & F.Muell.

Synonyms
- Echinocarpus australis Benth.

= Sloanea australis =

Species of flowering plant native to Australia

Sloanea australis, commonly known as the maiden's blush, is a rainforest tree of eastern Australia. The range of natural distribution is from near Batemans Bay (35° S) in southern New South Wales to Cape Tribulation (16° S) in tropical Queensland. The habitat of Sloanea australis is various types of rainforest; such as littoral, warm temperate, montane rainforest, sub tropical, and tropical rainforests. Often growing in particularly moist areas, such as next to streams.

The common name refers to the "blushing" pink colour of the heartwood, resembling a maiden's blush. This common name is also suited to the colour of the new leaves. Other common names include the blush alder, blush carrabeen, blush carrobean and cudgerie. Sloanea australis has bright pink new leaves which make identification easy. The irregular, crooked leaning trunk is also characteristic.

== Description ==
A medium to large tree, up to 30 metres (98 ft) tall with a stem diameter of 60 cm (24 in) with grey-brown bark. The trunk is buttressed, crooked, flanged and irregular with smaller branchlets coming from the main trunk. Alexander Floyd mentions a 55-metre (180 ft) tall individual at Border Ranges National Park.

Leaves alternate with wavy margins, toothed and obovate, 7 to 30 cm (2.8 to 11.8 in) long, some with a shortly blunted tip. Leaf stalks are 6 to 25 mm (0.24 to 0.98 in) long, with a bend at the junction of the leaf blade. Venation is prominent on both sides of the leaf.

Cream flowers form from October to November, in singles or on short racemes. A woody capsule matures from February to June, 15 to 20 mm (0.59 to 0.79 in) long. Inside is a fleshy orange aril, surrounding the three to five glossy black seeds. Fruit is eaten by a variety of rainforest birds including the paradise riflebird.

Germination from fresh seeds is not particularly difficult, woody branches and cuttings also strike well.
