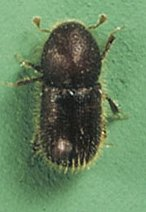

Scientific classification
- Kingdom: Animalia
- Phylum: Arthropoda
- Clade: Pancrustacea
- Class: Insecta
- Order: Coleoptera
- Suborder: Polyphaga
- Infraorder: Cucujiformia
- Superfamily: Curculionoidea
- Family: Curculionidae
- Genus: Coccotrypes
- Species: C. dactyliperda

Binomial name
- Coccotrypes dactyliperda Fabricius, 1801

= Coccotrypes dactyliperda =

Species of beetle

Coccotrypes dactyliperda, the date stone beetle, palm seed borer, or button beetle, is an insect belonging to the subfamily bark beetles (Scolytinae). It originates from Africa and is spread around the world due to the trading and transportation route.

The date stone beetle is known as the pest for the date palm. They mainly feed, breed, and live on the dates, which are the fruits of the date palm (Phoenix dactylifera). The dates provide enough nutrients to feed 70-80 beetles. Therefore, most beetles can spend their entire life within the same date. They would gnaw a hole on the date seed and create a tunnel. This penetration process leads to severe damage to the date seeds and huge economic and crop loss. Interestingly, the beetle only attacks the green unripe fruit and avoids the ripe fruit.

The date stone beetle has very similar characteristics with Callosobruchus chinensis in respect to behavior and habitat. Reproductive interference is shown between these two species. The date stone beetle uses the haplodiploid sex-determination system and inbred mating is very common. High-relatedness within C. dactyliperda galleries contributes to its high reproductive success and rapid population growth, which is crucial in its short-lived breeding site.

Mechanical pest control using dense netting bunch covers helps to protect dates and other fruits from these pests. Chemical pest control using organophosphates is also effective, but may have negative chemical side effects and requires multiple applications throughout the growing season.

== Distribution ==
Coccotrypes dactyliperda originates from Africa but has now a cosmopolitan distribution. They can live wherever the date palms grow. The beetle can be considered endemic to the Middle East and North Africa. Due to the date fruits being traded for consumption and the distribution of palm seeds for horticultural reasons, C. dactyliperda can be found in most subtropical and temperate zones.

== Description ==
Adults of the species are reddish-brown and 1.8–2.3 mm (0.07–0.09 in) long, with a convex shape and hairs on the dorsal surface. Characteristic of beetles, they have four wings, with the pair of hardened forewings protecting the pair of hindwings used for flying. They chew a round hole into green unripe dates, causing the fruit to drop 1 or 2 days later.

== Food resources ==
A single date seed was found to be a sufficient food supply for a brood, and in laboratory settings, supports the development and maturation of up to 70 to 80 beetles. When a new generation emerges and there is no nourishment left in the seed, the new generation searches for new seeds to feed on. Additionally, individual beetles seem to exhibit different food preferences, or different types of seeds.

=== Seed penetration ===
The location of the initial penetration of the date palm seeds by C. dactyliperda depends on the morphology of the drupe, specifically the surface features that offer the best traction for the beetle while gnawing into the drupe's pericarp. Most of the date palm seed surface is smooth, but the pedicle scar on the dorsal side is an uneven surface that allows the beetle to stem off its hindlegs and gain enough traction to push its mandibles into the epicarp of the seed. The beetle then tunnels through the path of least resistance, causing the penetration of the seed to occur at the proximal end of the distal groove. Once the beetle is able to start tunneling into the seed after gaining traction, the beetle will resume its penetration with frequent repositioning in octants. Inside the tunnel, the pair of middle legs act as wall anchors. The convex shape of the recto side of the seed does not provide any traction, which is why the dorsal groove side is favored by the beetle, allowing the beetle to stem against one or both sides while penetrating. Studies with hazelnuts showed that C. dactyliperda had successful penetration and incomplete penetration mainly on the rough surface of the proximal end of the seed. When there was traction opportunities, the penetration holes tended to be round, but when there was insufficient traction for the mid and/or hind legs, the penetration holes were more diffuse. Additionally, seed hardness influences the duration of the gnawing and tunneling by the beetle, which may be influenced by the volume of debris, or frass, generated. Specifically, the amount of debris influences the time intervals, or the duration of gnawing and tunneling, between debris removal. The harder seeds will produce less debris than soft seeds for the duration of gnawing.

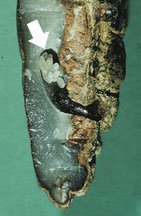
Eggs (arrow) in a date stone Larva

== Parental care ==
Adult female care of the eggs is required for offspring development. Female care includes grooming, egg rolling, and likely antibiotic salivary secretions. The eggs may be tended by multiple females. Because the eggs are laid in organic substances, care is required to prevent fungal or bacterial growth. If the females are removed, the eggs will have no larvae and will grow mold and desiccate.

== Life cycle ==
It takes about 22–25 days for an egg to develop through a larva and pupa into an adult, with males developing faster than females. Mated females live on average 73 days while unmated ones live on average 63 days. Studies show that neither eggs nor larvae can survive if ejected from the brood gallery. In a laboratory setting of 28 °C, the average egg incubation period is 5.9 days, the larval duration is 12 to 15 days, and pupal development is 4 days. For females, the development from egg to adult is 24.8 days, compared to males, which is 22.1 days. At 20 °C, the development of females is 49 days. Additionally, mated females produce significantly more offspring than unmated females.

The entire life cycle of C. dactyliperda occurs inside the seed. After three to five days of inhabiting a new seed, mated females start to lay eggs. Unmated females are able to produce male offspring, which they then mate with to produce male and female offspring. Female and male siblings will also mate and produce offspring of both sexes. During the winter, the female C. dactyliperda enter a hibernation or dormancy period inside the seed they hatched in, and in late June to early July, the first generation of female beetles leave the brood chamber. Temperatures at or below 15 °C coupled with reduced photoperiods, or shorter days, initiates hibernation, where temperatures above 25 °C and with longer photoperiods terminates hibernation.

== Dispersal ==
=== Dispersal via vectors ===
The dispersal of C. dactyliperda infested drupes is due to birds and terrestrial vertebrates, mainly canids and ursids that consume the drupes on the ground. Often, the beetle infests the date palm seeds after the pericarp has already been consumed by other animals, such as rodents. A study in Israel found that at the end of the breeding season in October, 10% of the seeds on the ground had been infested, but after hibernation and the first generation in March, 95% of the seeds on the ground had been infested.

=== Exposure ===
The infested seed may be exposed to mastication and subsequent ejection from the mouth, such as from fruit bats, or to partial digestion and subsequent defecation, such as from canids. The survival of the C. dactyliperda female and its brood depends on the extent of exposure to gastrointestinal liquids, such as saliva, gastric acid, and intestinal fluids. Because there will only be a single penetration hole in the seed from C. dactyliperda, the exposure to gastric fluids is limited, and even if exposed, studies show that C. dactyliperda will survive the exposure for a short time. If the emerging beetles are enable to find suitable host seeds, the beetles can successfully reproduce at the new location.

The mortality of adult C. dactyliperda inside seeds ingested by vertebrates is very low, and the vertebrates are vectors that may aid in the dispersal of the species due to the medium to long range transport of the seed away from the host tree.

=== Dispersal from the natal seed ===
The newly born beetles can choose whether to stay or leave the natal seed. It was found that more outbred female offsprings leave the natal patch than inbred offsprings. Some advantages to stay in the natal patch include minimizing predating risk, avoiding spending time to look for new sites and mates, and potential help from relatives to raise the young.

Another theory considers the dispersal behavior under local selection. Beetles from the same inbred population are more closely related and thus might be selected to have more cooperation and less dispersal behavior. Contrarily, the more variable outbred population would have less cooperative behavior.

== Reproduction ==
=== Mating behaviors ===
The species uses the haplodiploid sex-determination system: females are diploid while males are haploid; unmated females produce male offspring by parthenogenesis while mated females produce both male and female offspring. Both in beetles from collected date stones and in laboratory cultures, about 85–93% of the adults are females.

C. dactyliperda exhibit traits that may support cooperative breeding. When a flying unfertilized female reaches a target such as a date stone, sweet almond, betel nut, nutmeg, cinnamon bark or a button made from vegetable ivory, (hence the name "button beetle"), she bores a hole in it and excavates a chamber. (Males cannot penetrate the stone.) It is found that seed availability, and therefore food availability, has no effect on any measure of reproductive success. The adult female beetle chews a round hole, which is approximately 1 mm in diameter, in the date seed, and forms a cavity, where she lays her eggs. Adult males are unable to penetrate the date stone and remain outside until a hole is formed. Usually, a single female lays eggs into a single gallery of a seed. Inside, she produces a brood of four or five males. She mates with the first son that reaches maturity, then proceeds to eat them all. If the founding female is fertilized, her first generation of offspring will include both sexes. The hatched females will mate with the hatched male siblings, and the majority of the offspring will leave the brood chamber. The females that remain will continue their own oviposition, or egg laying, while the founding female also continues reproducing, creating overlapping generations. If the volume of the host seed is sufficient, the third generation of females may also breed, mating with the first or second generation males. If the female is unfertilized, her first generation will include only males, and the breeding process will continue after she mates with one of her sons. This breeding process causes extremely high relatedness among individuals inhabiting a seed. When the seed is fully consumed, all the remaining females will vacate the brood chamber, while the males tend to remain in the seed and die.

=== Potential advantages ===
It is found that females are able to distinguish between males from the same population and from a different population. When compared to outbred beetles, more offspring are found in colonies of inbred females, even if the number of eggs are the same, suggesting a higher level of cooperation or reduced conflict in the inbred colonies. This may be due to better care of the eggs in the presence of inbred siblings, reduced egg cannibalism with higher relatedness, or a general greater viability of the eggs in inbred populations. There are also more independent young and fewer dispersers (those who leave the natal seed) in inbred colonies. The greater reproductive success of inbred females allows the colony to grow rapidly, especially in early stages of development, a characteristic that would be important in unstable environments where high-quality breeding sites are available for a short season, which is common in the species. More than three generations can occupy a single seed before the seed is completely consumed. This allows for extensive social interactions among the related colony members.

== Pest of crop plants ==
C. dactyliperda are well-known date pests throughout the world and in Israel, among other species. It infests green, unripe fruit, causing it to drop, a different behavior than that of nitidulid beetles, another date pest, which attack ripe fruit, causing the fruit to rot. Both behaviors lead to reduced yield and lower quality of fruit. A study from June to October 1975 at Afiqim (Jordan Valley) in a date palm grove found that fruit drop from C. dactyliperda mainly occurred in late July and resulted in a 30-40% yield loss. The infestations from this species had a sharp decrease after July, when the fruit ripens, and fruit drops after this period were not due to C. dactyliperda activity. C. dactyliperda is abundant in the Jordan valley but its populations in the southern desert of Israel are very low, causing no fruit drop in that region.

=== Control ===
Organophosphates may be efficient in controlling C. dactyliperda infestations in dates. However, controlling these pests chemically would require several applications throughout the season. Mechanical control, such as dense netting bunch covers, will help date growers avoid chemical treatment side effects and will also protect against other fruit and date pests.
