= Sloanea berteroana =

Scientific classification
- Kingdom: Plantae
- Clade: Tracheophytes
- Clade: Angiosperms
- Clade: Eudicots
- Clade: Rosids
- Order: Oxalidales
- Family: Elaeocarpaceae
- Genus: Sloanea
- Species: S. berteroana

Binomial name
- Sloanea berteroana Choisy ex DC.

Species of flowering plant of the Caribbean region

Sloanea berteroana is a tree of the Caribbean region. The name is often misspelled as Sloanea berteriana. (Note: See, for example, "Puerto Rico Statewide Assessment and Strategies for Forest Resources." Government of Puerto Rico. Department of Natural and Environmental Resources. (n.d.; ca., 2011) Page 88. (Retrieved 10 August 2013.) and "Sloanea berteriana (sic) Choisy ex DC. bullwood." USDA. Natural Resources Conservation Service (NRCS). Plants Database. 2013. (Retrieved 10 August 2013.)) Its vernacular names include montillo and bullwood. It is native to Puerto Rico. This tree is common in the Toro Negro State Forest.

== Uses ==
The Pirahã, a Brazilian tribe, rub them on their eyelids to stay awake. This probably works because of some kind of alkaloid in the bark of the plant. They know that danger is everywhere around them in the jungle and that a deep sleep can make one defenseless.
