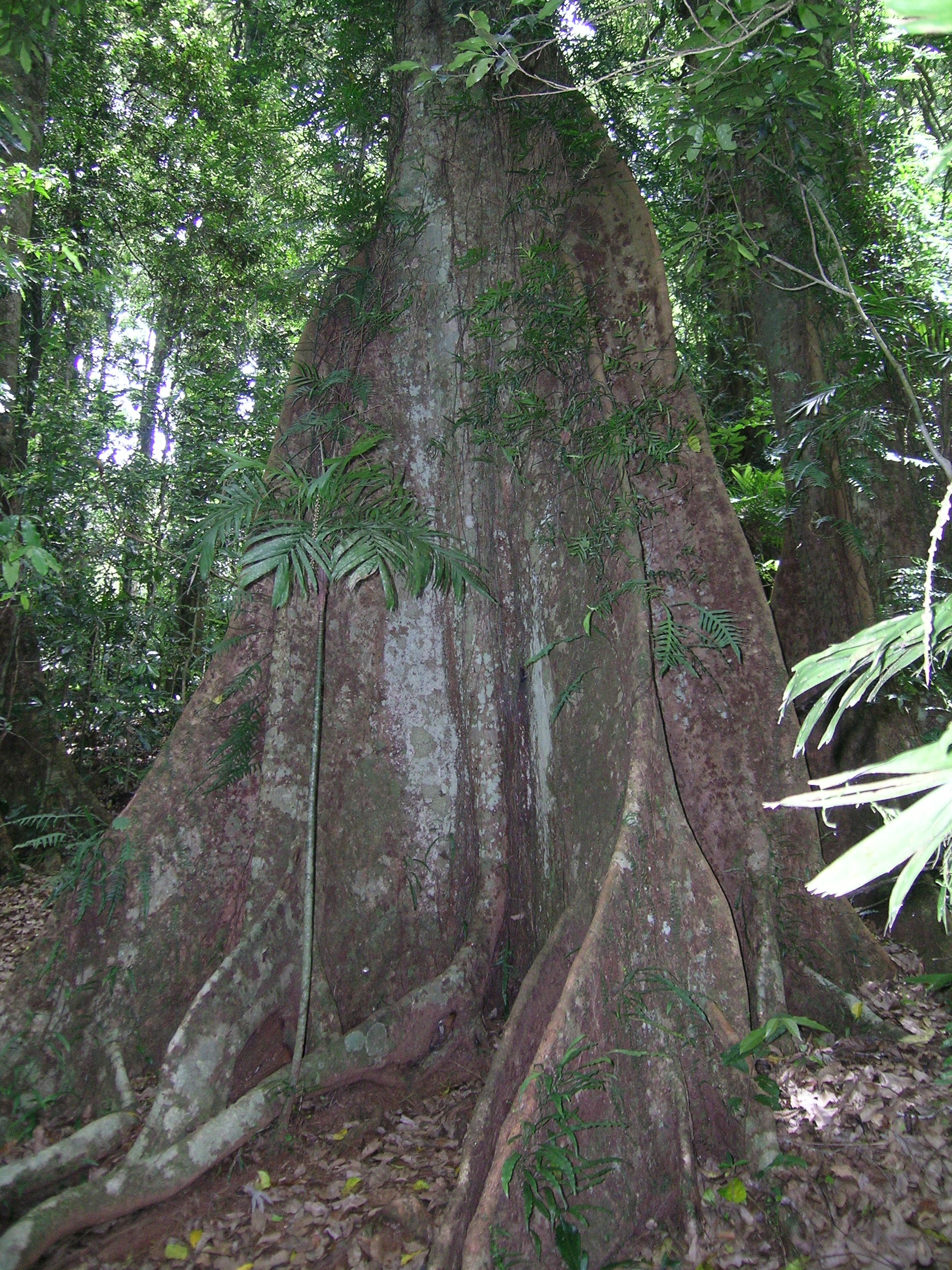
- Sloanea woollsii

Scientific classification
- Kingdom: Plantae
- Clade: Tracheophytes
- Clade: Angiosperms
- Clade: Eudicots
- Clade: Rosids
- Order: Oxalidales
- Family: Elaeocarpaceae
- Genus: Sloanea; L.

Type species
- Sloanea dentata L.

= Sloanea =

Sloanea Temporal range: 34–0 Ma

Genus of flowering plants

Sloanea is a genus of flowering plants in the family Elaeocarpaceae, comprising about 180 species.

Species include:

- Sloanea acutiflora Uittien
- Sloanea assamica Rehder & E. Wilson
- Sloanea australis Benth. & F.Muell., an Australian rainforest tree
- Sloanea berteroana Choisy ex DC.
- Sloanea caribaea Krug & Urb. ex Duss
- Sloanea gracilis Uittien
- Sloanea lepida Tirel
- Sloanea shankii Standl. & L.O.Williams
- Sloanea suaveolens Tirel
- Sloanea tomentosa Rehder & E. Wilson
- Sloanea woollsii F.Muell., an Australian rainforest tree

== Fossil record ==
†Sloanea olmediaefolia has been described from many fossil leaves collected from lower Oligocene strata from 1857 to 1889 in Santa Giustina and Sassello in Central Liguria, Italy. Fossil leaves of this species have also been collected from the continental (fluvial and limnic) beds of the Csatka Formation near Oroszlány (western Hungary, northeastern Transdanubia); these beds are from the 34 million years old Oligocene regional stage Kiscellian.
