= Gumbaynggirr State Conservation Area =

Gumbayngirr State Conservation Area
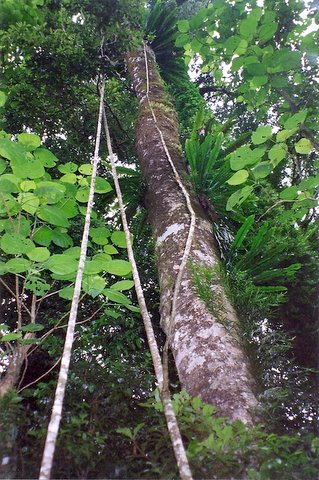
- Carabeen, stinging tree, Pothos, Birds Nest Fern, and Pepper Vine in the conservation area.

- Location within New South Wales
- Location: New South Wales
- Nearest city: Nambucca Heads
- Coordinates: 30°35.4578′S 152°35.4198′E
- Area: 25.61 km^{2} (9.89 sq mi)
- Established: 1 July 2003
- Governing body: NSW National Parks and Wildlife Service
- Website: Official website

The Gumbayngirr State Conservation Area is a protected conservation area located in the Mid North Coast region of New South Wales, in eastern Australia. The 2,561-hectare (6,330-acre) conservation area is situated west of Nambucca Heads and contains a sub–tropical jungle, known as the League Scrub. Another section of the park, formerly known was the Little Wonder State Forest, was protected from logging by a year long blockade in 1992.

== Features ==
Part of the reserve is situated on a basaltic bench, with relatively fertile red soils. Pumice can be seen on the forest floor, indicating previous volcanic activity. The altitude is 750 metres (2,460 ft) above sea level with a high rainfall. The rainforest has not been logged, and consists of a diverse jungle of 73 tree species, forming an impressive 40 metres (130 ft) canopy.

Significant tree species include stinging tree, yellow carabeen, Moreton Bay fig, small leaf fig, black booyong, bonewood, purple cherry, sour cherry and rose maple.

== Gallery ==
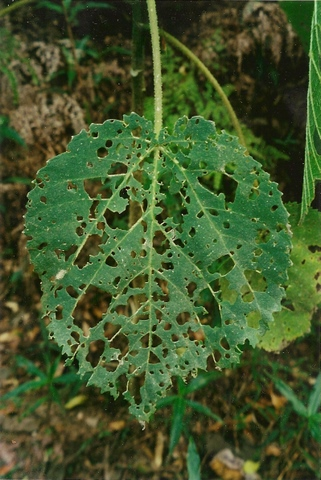
Leaf of the giant stinging tree, Gumbaynggirr State Conservation Area

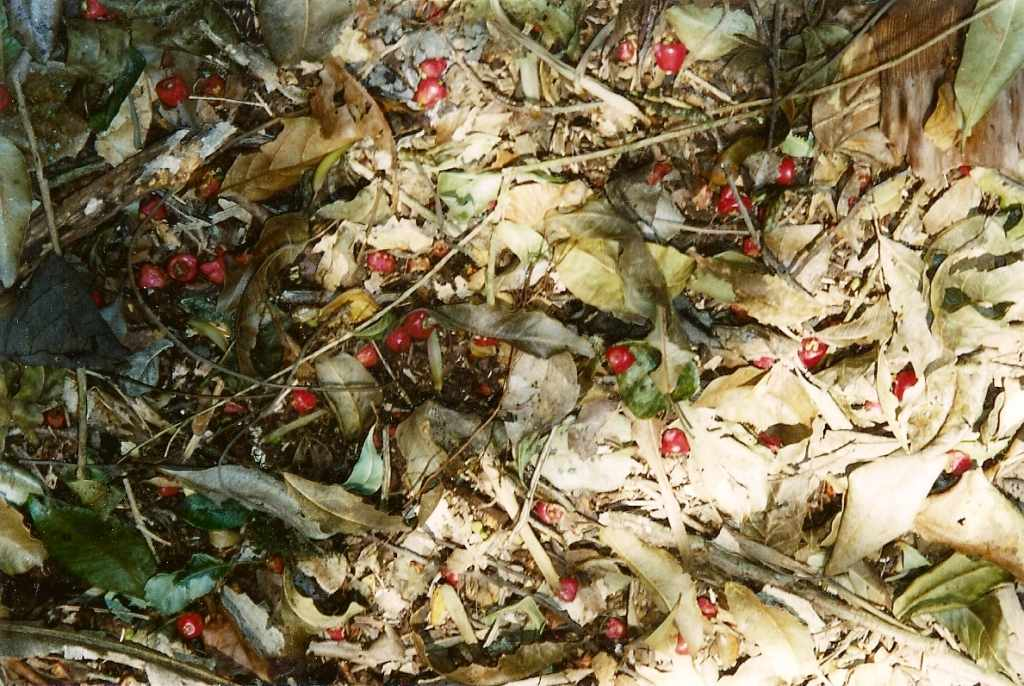
Sour cherry, fruit on the rainforest floor, Gumbaynggirr State Conservation Area

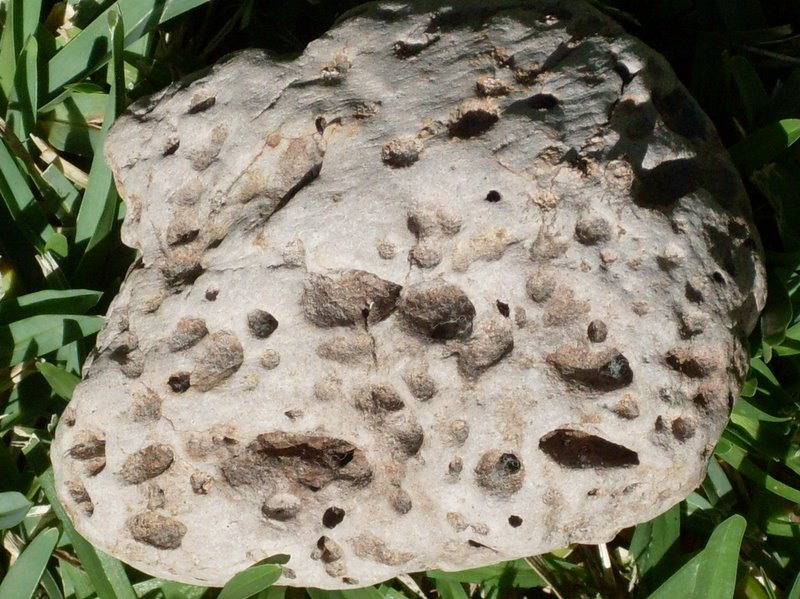
Pumice from the rainforest floor at Gumbaynggirr State Conservation Area

== See also ==
- Protected areas of New South Wales
