= Boorganna Nature Reserve =

Protected area in New South Wales, Australia

- IUCN category Ia (strict nature reserve)
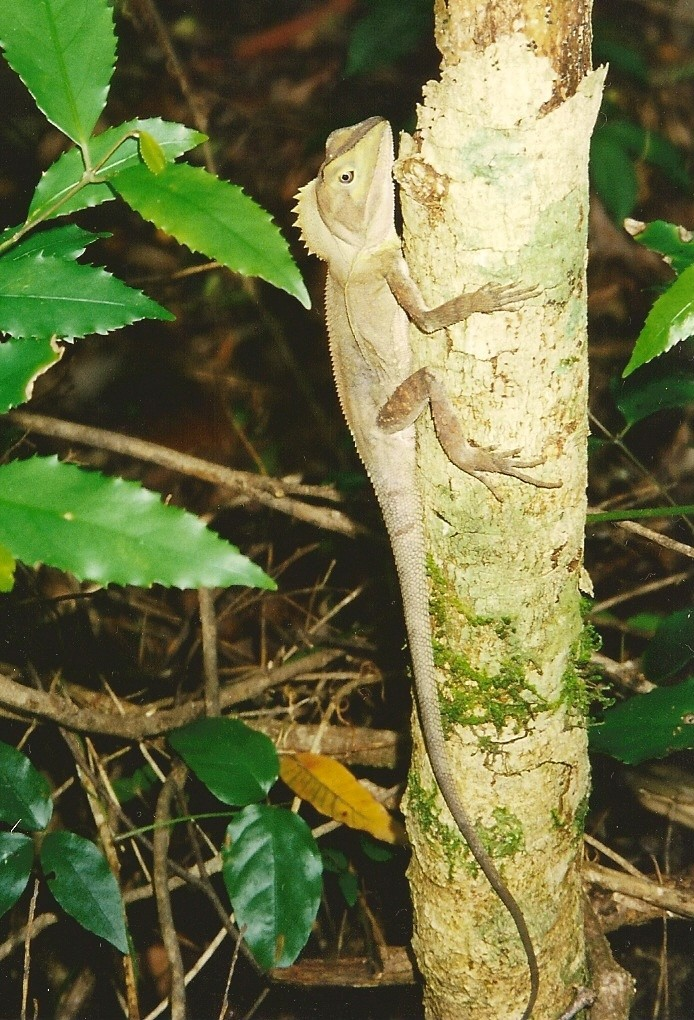
- Southern angle headed dragon in the reserve

- Location within New South Wales
- Location: New South Wales
- Nearest city: Comboyne
- Coordinates: 31°38.015′S 152°23.74′E
- Area: 4 km^{2} (1.5 sq mi)
- Established: 12 March 1904
- Governing body: NSW National Parks & Wildlife Service
- Website: http://www.nationalparks.nsw.gov.au/boorganna-nature-reserve

The Boorganna Nature Reserve is a protected nature reserve located northwest of Taree on the Comboyne Plateau in New South Wales, Australia. The 396-hectare (980-acre) reserve, managed by the NSW National Parks & Wildlife Service, was gazetted in 1904 and is the second oldest nature reserve in the state. The reserve features various forest types, including stands of sub tropical rainforest of which the large rosewood, yellow carabeen and small leaf fig are particularly noteworthy. The reserve is a remnant of the former extensive rainforest on the Comboyne Plateau. The plateau was cleared between 1900 and 1925. Australian red cedar was logged in the area in the nineteenth century. Originally proposed to be part of the world heritage rainforest group. The exploration, knowledge, uses and history of this area by Indigenous Australians is not well known in the present day. Boorganna Nature Reserve was proposed, but rejected for inclusion on the UNESCO World Heritage, due to being geographically isolated from other rainforests in the group.

== Location and features ==
A picnic area next to the forest provides chairs and tables for visitors. Walking trails, a lookout to Rawson Falls and an information board is also provided. Picnics provide a pleasant view of the nearby area. A variety of small birds appear from the edge of the forest. The reserve is situated 32 kilometres (20 mi) north of Taree, with access via Wingham. Form the southwest, the reserve is situated 35 kilometres (22 mi) from Wauchope; and is approximately 6 kilometres (3.7 mi) from the town of Comboyne. The reserve lies to the south of the Oxley Highway, enabling access via Port Macquarie and Tamworth.

== Geology and climate ==
The reserve receives an average annual rainfall of 1,930 millimetres (76 in). The climate is sub tropical, though at an elevation ranging from 360 to 732 metres (1,181 to 2,402 ft), it is cooler than at the coast nearby. Soils are derived from Miocene basalt, which provide a deep red loam. Below the basalt are less fertile sedimentary rocks. The western area of the reserve where it adjoins the Great Dividing Range has partly eroded, forming areas of cliffs, rocks and shallow soils. Deep gullies, isolated hills and sharp edged rocky ridges occur here. Rocks include pebbly mudstone, conglomerate siltstone and shale. Serpentinite outcrops can also be seen.

== Fauna ==
Animals are seldom seen in the rainforest, being nocturnal. However, many species live in the reserve, such as bats, wallabies, possums, gliders, spotted quoll, platypus, bandicoots, pademelons, bush rats, snakes, lizards and antechinus.

Bird life is varied and extensive with around a hundred species recorded. Many rainforest pigeons frequent the reserve such as the rose crowned fruit dove and wompoo fruit dove. As well as other seldom seen species such as the noisy pitta, green catbird, and figbird.

Invertebrate biology is not so well understood. However, a vast number of insects, arachnids, molluscs, worms and other small creatures live in the rainforest. Leeches are often noticed by bushwalkers after rain. Red triangle slugs and blue planarian live on the forest floor. Tree dwelling snails may be found here.

== Flora ==
=== Sub tropical rainforest ===
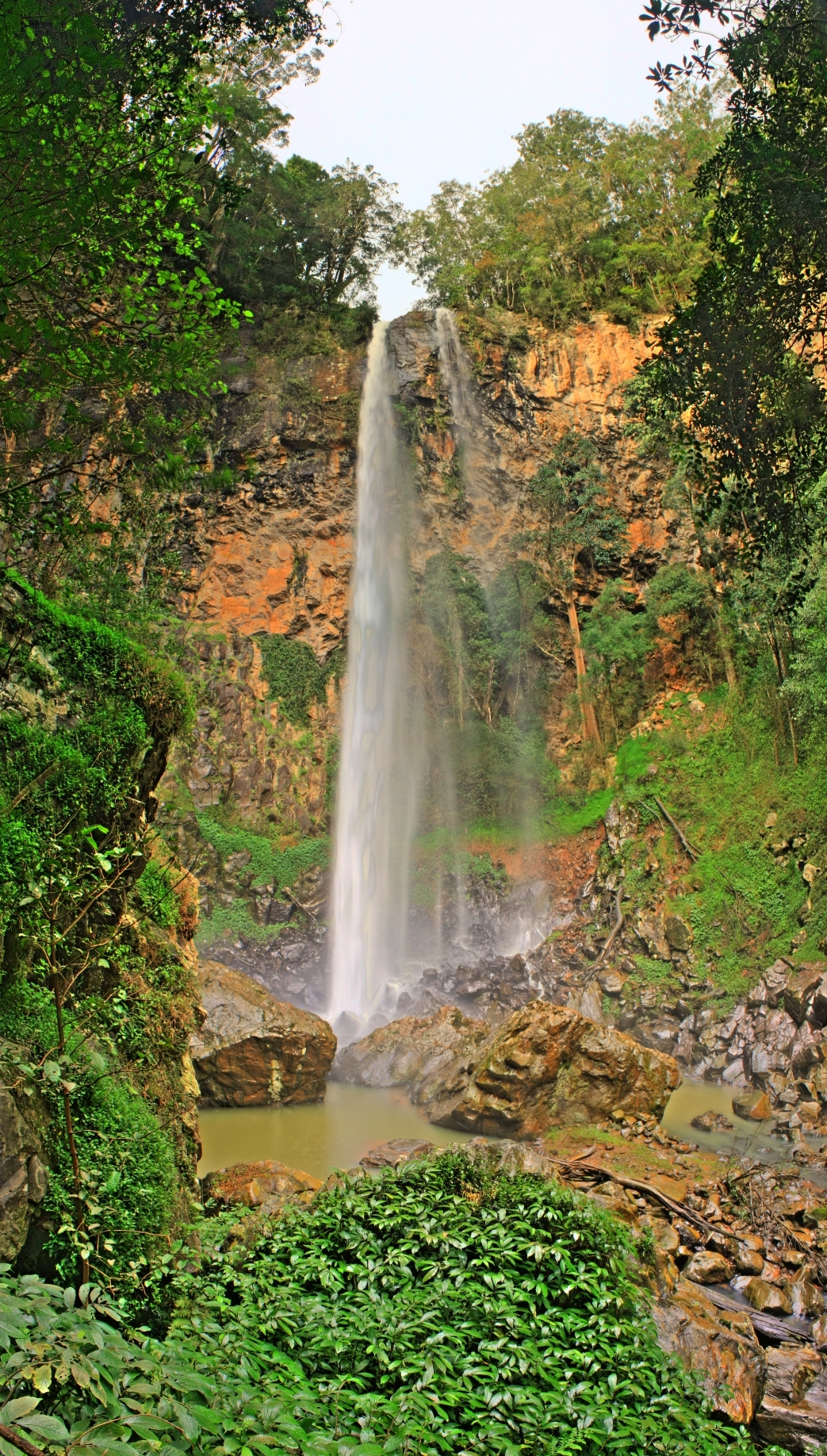
Rawson Falls

The jungle or sub tropical rainforest features a dark forest with many large trees. Several species grow to great height and a broad trunk diameter, such as yellow carabeen, small leaf fig, Moreton Bay fig, rosewood, black booyong, giant stinging tree, pigeonberry ash, brush box and silver quandong. Other smaller plants of interest include the walking stick palm and the Macleay laurel.

Boorganna Nature Reserve features several plants at or near their most southern limit of natural distribution. Such as the sour cherry, purple cherry, white apple, turnipwood and the red carabeen.

The Antarctic beech is now considered extinct at Boorganna. However, some of its associated species still persist at Boorganna. Antarctic beech has been recorded at four nearby sites in the Comboyne area, growing in cool stream side rainforests at elevations ranging from 570 to 630 metres above sea level.

=== Warm temperate rainforest ===
Below the more fertile basalt is a poorer soil type. Warm temperate species are more frequently seen here, such as the coachwood, watergum, sassafras and lilly pilly.

=== Gully rainforest ===
Gully rainforest occurs south of Mumford's Creek, in steep sided narrow gullies. Plant species from the sub-tropical and warm temperate rainforest occur here. They include whalebone tree, walking stick palms and the Bangalow palm.

=== Dry rainforest ===
Where the soil is shallow, and conditions are exposed to winds and fire is infrequent, dry rainforest occurs. Rainforest tree species in this area include the grey myrtle and shatterwood.

=== Eucalyptus forest ===
Eucalyptus forest occurs in areas where fires often occur. In the wetter areas are Sydney blue gum, brush box, tallowwood, and New England blackbutt. Some of the tallowwoods are particularly tall and impressive in this area. The drier eucalyptus areas are subject to higher winds, frequent fires and shallow less fertile soils. Trees here include the black sheoak.

== Fungi ==
At Boorganna Nature Reserve fungi is noticeable and often colourful and spectacular, particularly after rain in the autumn. The bracket rainbow fungus often appears on fallen logs.

== Photos from Boorganna Nature Reserve ==
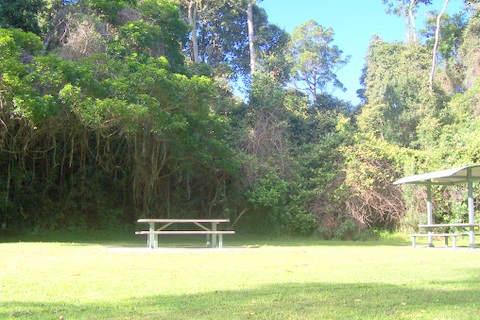
Picnic area by the carpark at Boorganna Nature Reserve

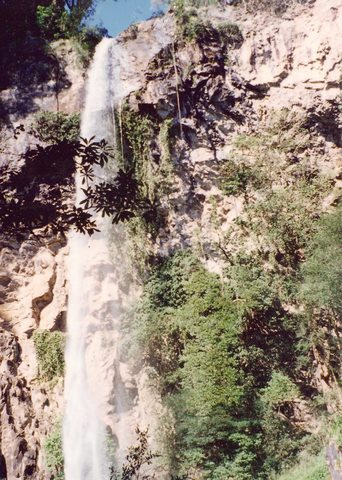
Rawson Falls

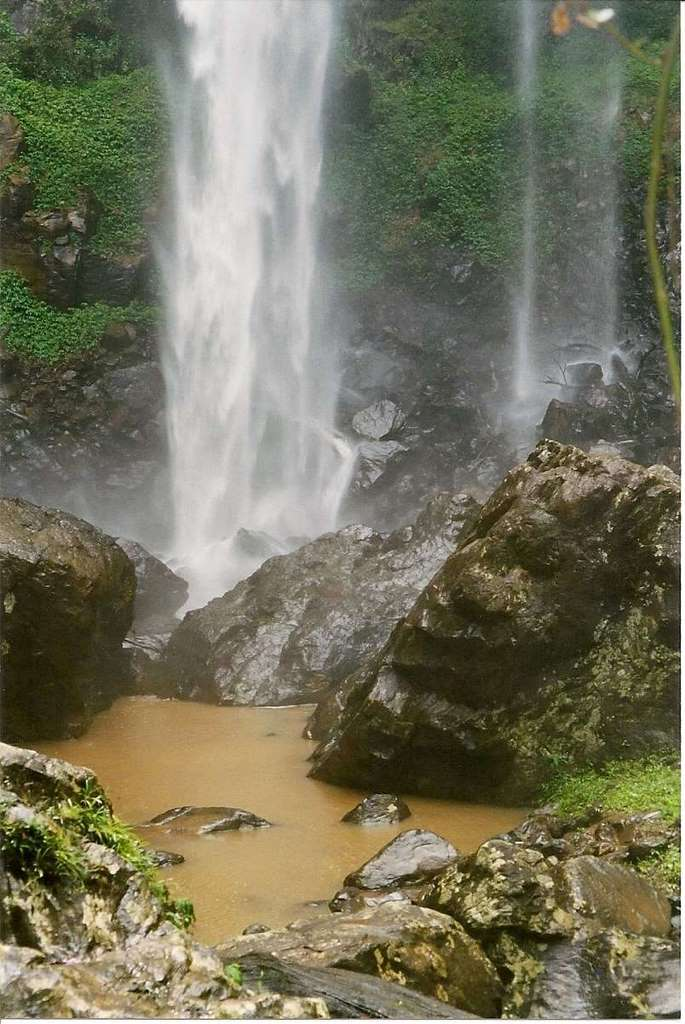
base of Rawson Falls

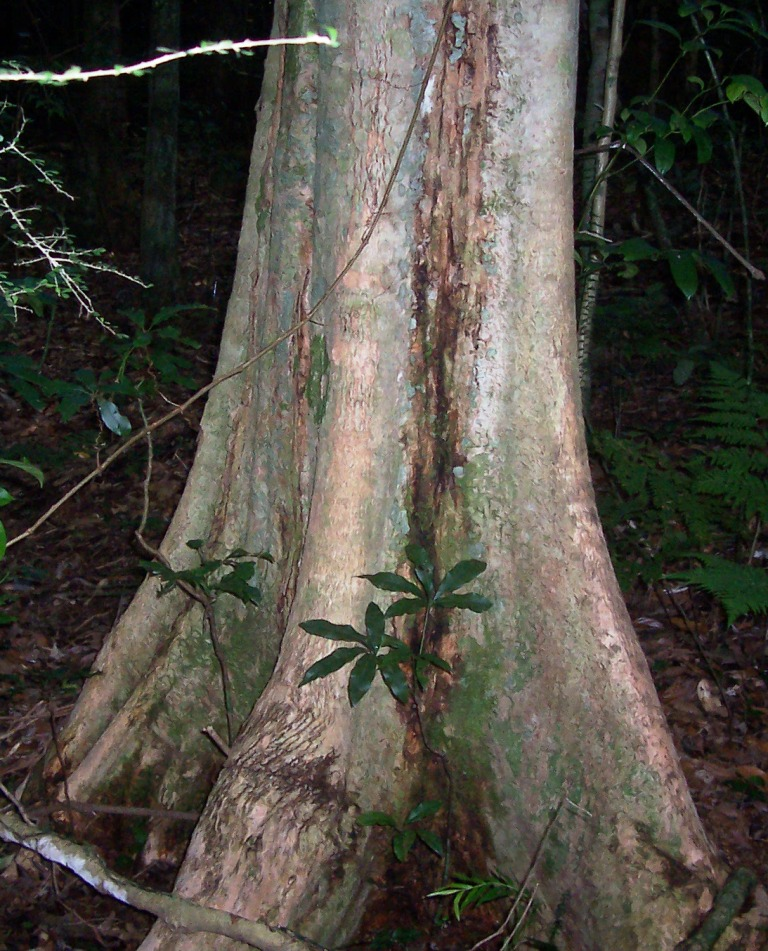
Sour cherry at Boorganna Nature Reserve

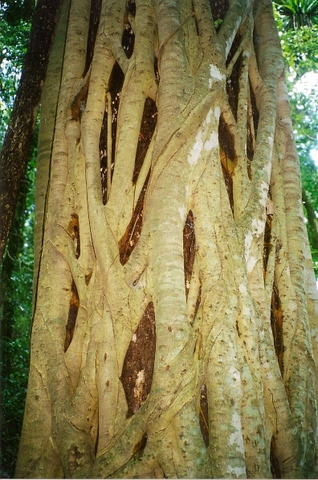
Small leaf fig at Boorganna Nature Reserve

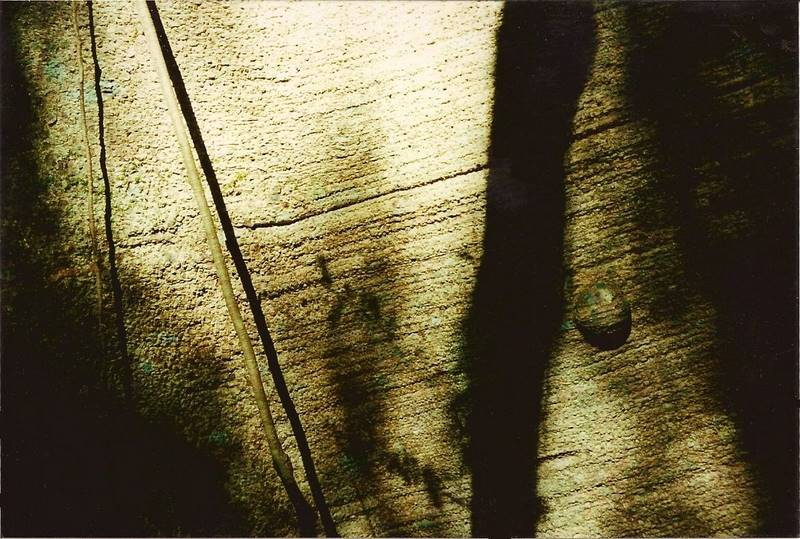
Small leaf fig bark at Boorganna Nature Reserve

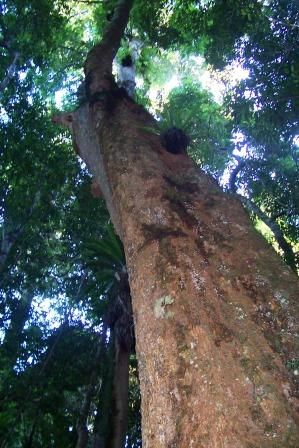
Rosewood at Boorganna Nature Reserve

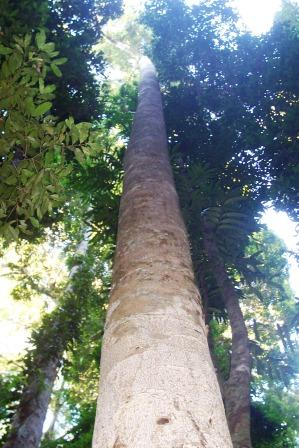
Pigeonberry ash at Boorganna Nature Reserve

White beech at Boorganna Nature Reserve

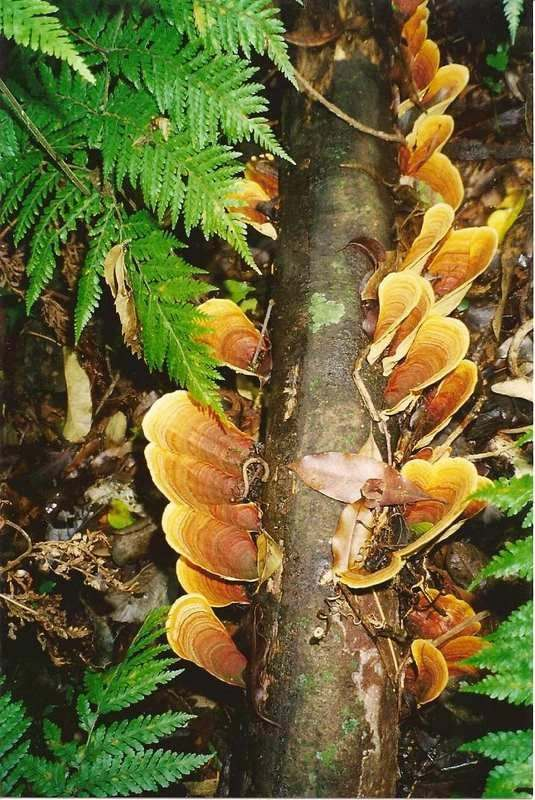
Rainbow bracket fungi at Boorganna Nature Reserve

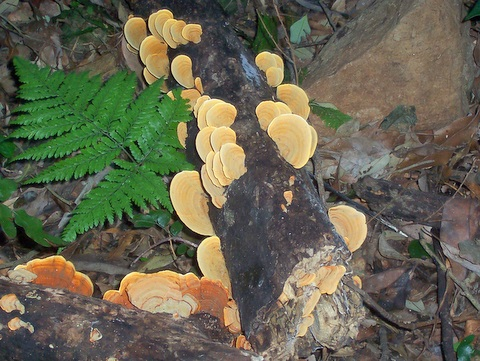
Fungi at Boorganna Nature Reserve

== See also ==
- Protected areas of New South Wales
