= Pothos paiei =

Scientific classification
- Kingdom: Plantae
- Clade: Tracheophytes
- Clade: Angiosperms
- Clade: Monocots
- Order: Alismatales
- Family: Araceae
- Subfamily: Pothoideae
- Tribe: Potheae
- Genus: Pothos
- Species: P. paiei

Binomial name
- Pothos paiei (M.Hotta) S.Y.Wong, A.Hay & P.C.Boyce (2020)

Synonyms
- Pedicellarum paiei M.Hotta (1976)

Genus of flowering plants

Pothos paiei is a species of flowering plant in the family Araceae. It is a climber endemic to the island of Borneo.

The species was first described in 1976 as Pedicellarum paiei, and placed in the monotypic genus Pedicellarum. The species was renamed Pothos paiei in 2020 when the genus Pedicellarum was subsumed into genus Pothos.
