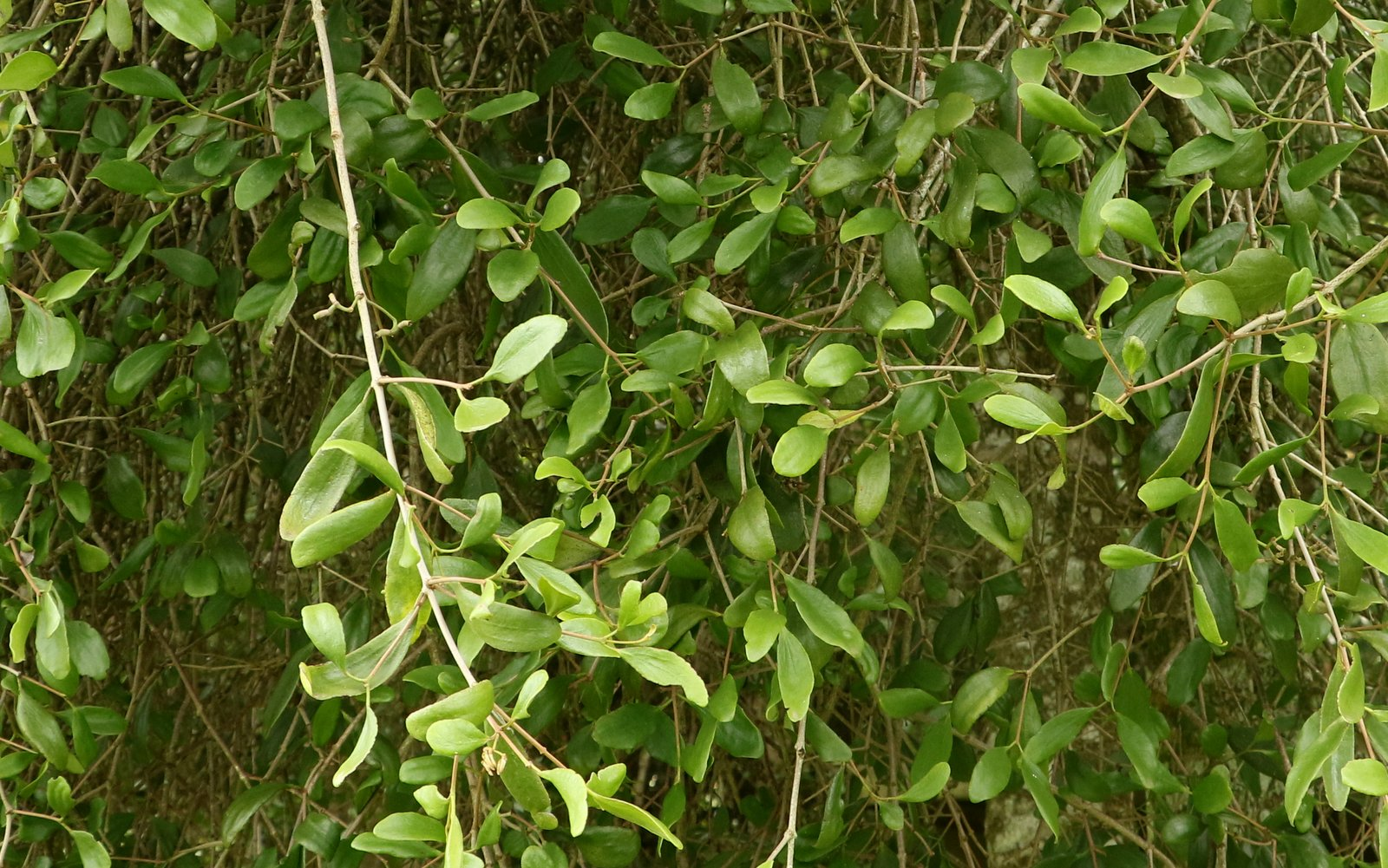
- Boorganna Nature Reserve, Australia

Scientific classification
- Kingdom: Plantae
- Clade: Tracheophytes
- Clade: Angiosperms
- Clade: Eudicots
- Order: Santalales
- Family: Loranthaceae
- Genus: Benthamina
- Species: B. alyxifolia

Binomial name
- Benthamina alyxifolia (F.Muell. ex Benth.) Tiegh.

Synonyms
- Loranthus alyxifolius F.Muell. ex Benth.

= Benthamina alyxifolia =

Species of mistletoe

Benthamina alyxifolia is a species of mistletoe plant, found in Australia.
