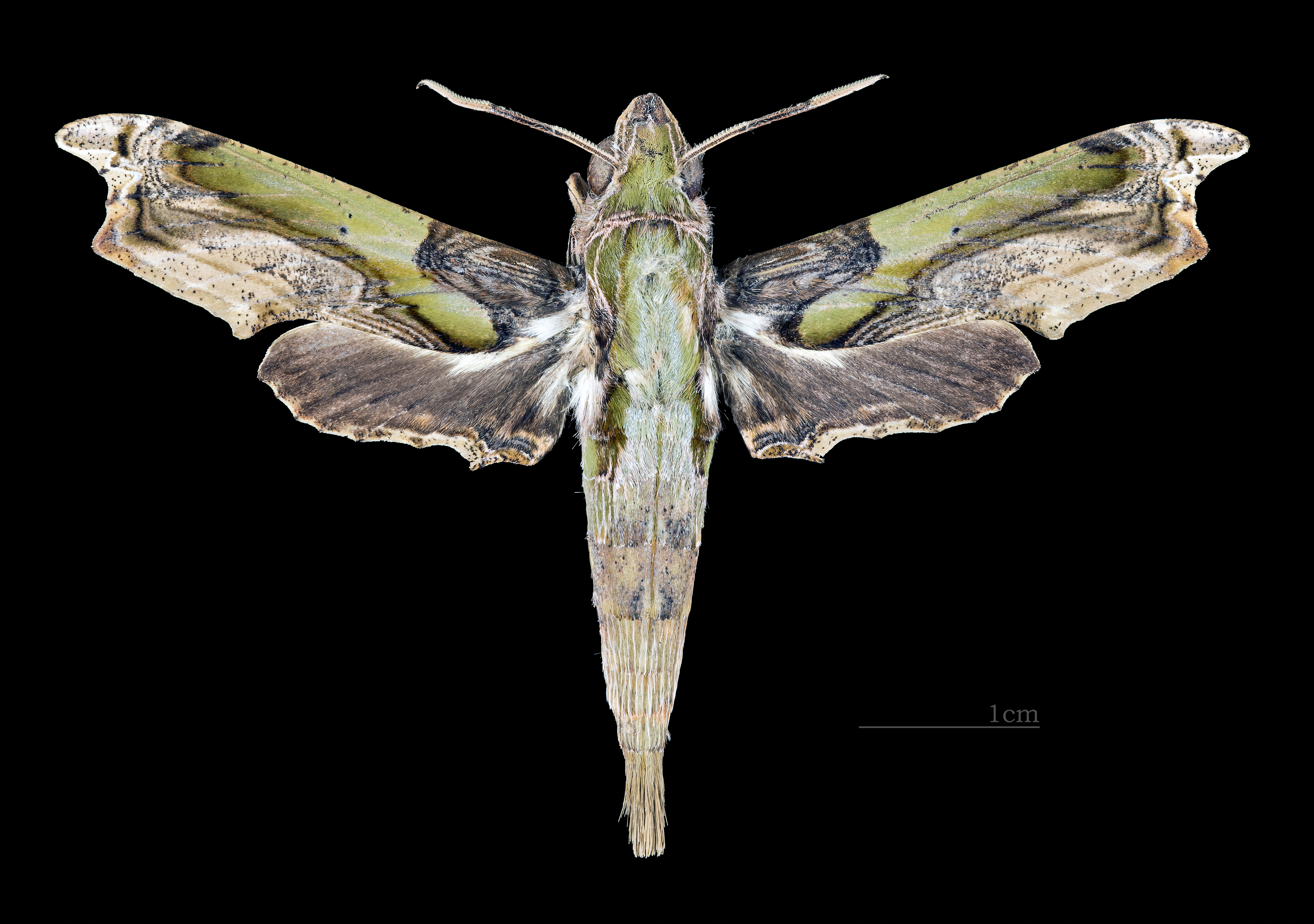
- Eupanacra busiris Dorsal
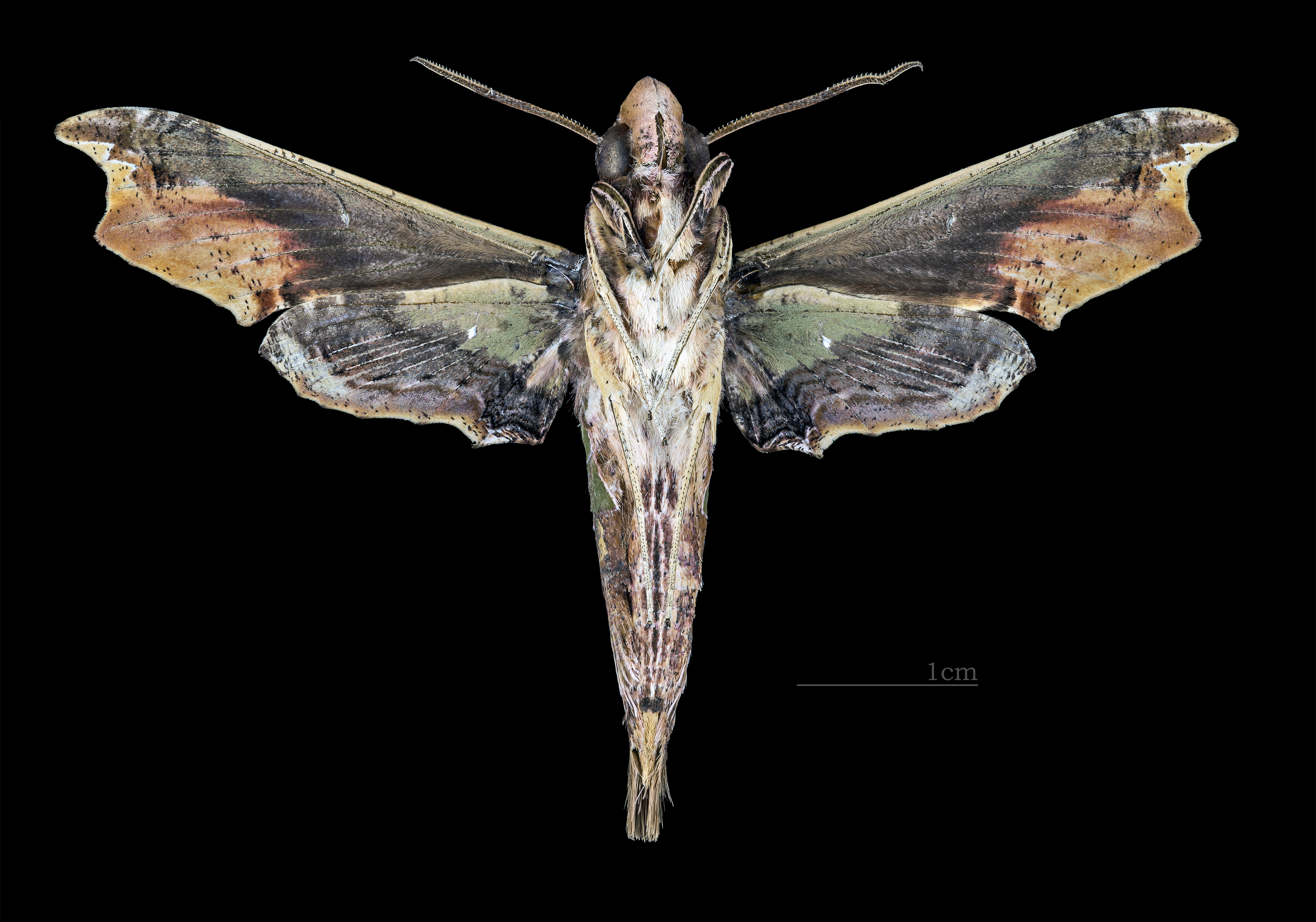
- Eupanacra busiris Ventral

Scientific classification
- Kingdom: Animalia
- Phylum: Arthropoda
- Class: Insecta
- Order: Lepidoptera
- Family: Sphingidae
- Genus: Eupanacra
- Species: E. busiris

Binomial name
- Eupanacra busiris (Walker, 1856)

Synonyms
- Panacra busiris Walker, 1856; Panacra busiris atima Rothschild & Jordan, 1915; Panacra busiris marina Rothschild & Jordan, 1915

= Eupanacra busiris =

Species of moth

Eupanacra busiris, the green rippled hawkmoth, is a moth of the family Sphingidae.

== Distribution ==
It is known from Malaysia (Peninsular, Sarawak), Indonesia (Sumatra, Java, Kalimantan, Sulawesi), Nepal, north-eastern India, the Andaman Islands, Myanmar, Thailand, southern China, Vietnam and the Philippines. Probably also in Sri Lanka.

== Description ==
The wingspan is 68–82 mm.

== Biology ==
Adults are on wing from late March to late August in Hong Kong. They fly at dusk and are attracted to the flowers of Duranta erecta.

The larvae have been recorded on Lasia species and Pothos scandens in India.

== Subspecies ==
- Eupanacra busiris busiris (Malaysia (Peninsular, Sarawak), Indonesia (Sumatra, Java, Kalimantan), Nepal, north-eastern India, Myanmar, Thailand, southern China and Vietnam)
- Eupanacra busiris atima (Rothschild & Jordan, 1915) (India)
- Eupanacra busiris marina (Rothschild & Jordan, 1915) (Andaman Islands)
- Eupanacra busiris myosotis Cadiou & Holloway, 1989 (Sulawesi)
- Eupanacra busiris schuetzi Hogenes & Treadaway, 1996 (the Philippines)
