= Pothos lancifolius =

Scientific classification
- Kingdom: Plantae
- Clade: Tracheophytes
- Clade: Angiosperms
- Clade: Monocots
- Order: Alismatales
- Family: Araceae
- Subfamily: Pothoideae
- Tribe: Potheae
- Genus: Pothos
- Species: P. lancifolius

Binomial name
- Pothos lancifolius Hook.f.

Synonyms
- Pothos penicilliger Gagnep.

Species of flowering plant

Pothos lancifolius is climbing plant species described by Hooker in the family Araceae. No subspecies are listed in the Catalogue of Life. This species has been recorded from Peninsular Malaysia and Vietnam - where it is called ráy leo lá rách or ráy leo hình bút lông.
