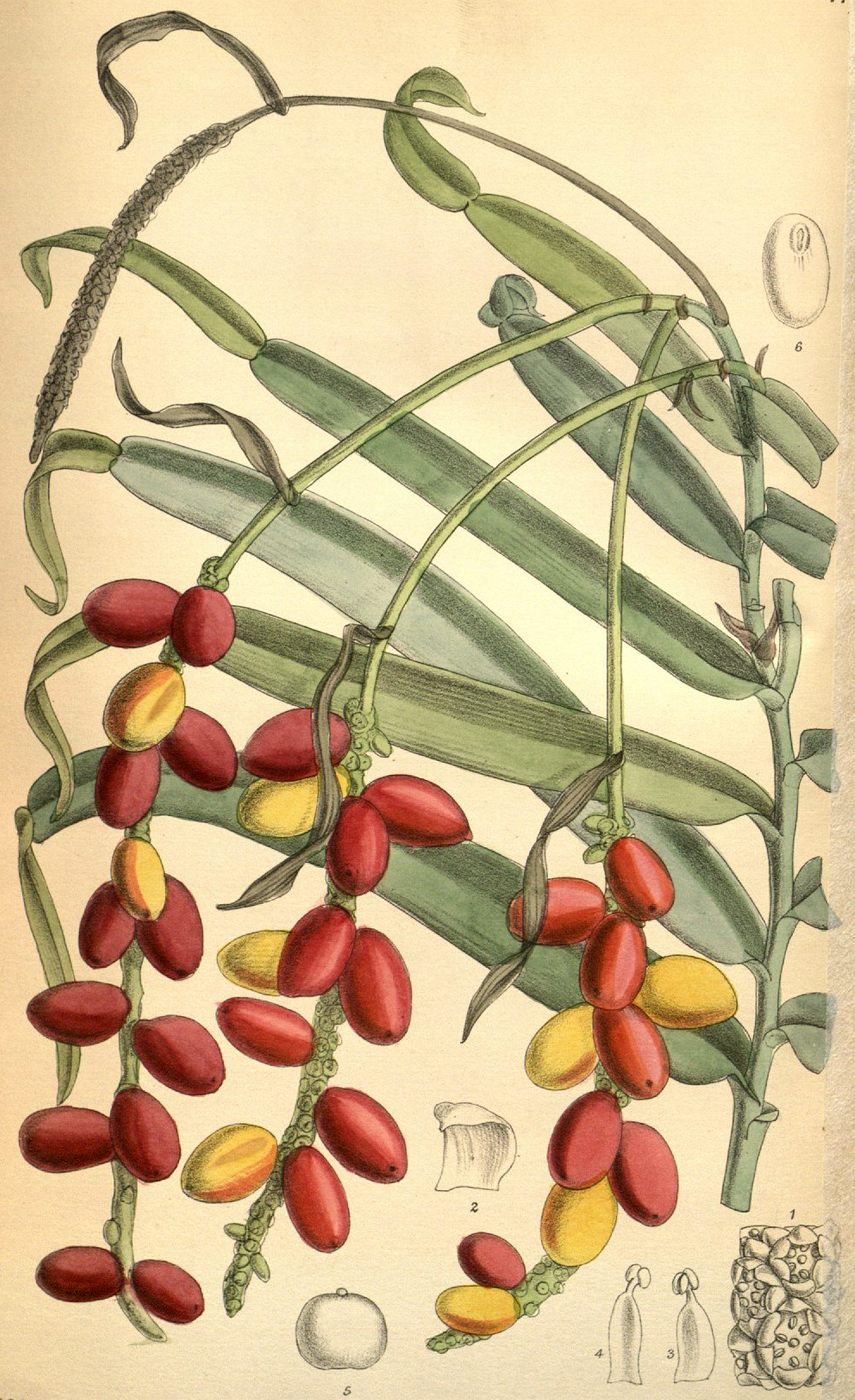

Scientific classification
- Kingdom: Plantae
- Clade: Tracheophytes
- Clade: Angiosperms
- Clade: Monocots
- Order: Alismatales
- Family: Araceae
- Subfamily: Pothoideae
- Tribe: Potheae
- Genus: Pothos
- Species: P. repens

Binomial name
- Pothos repens (Lour.) Druce

Synonyms
- Pothos terminalis Hance; Pothos loureiroi Hook. & Arn. Flagellaria repens Lour.

= Pothos repens =

Species of flowering plant

Pothos repens is a species of climbing tropical forest plant in the family Araceae and the genus Pothos. No subspecies are recorded in the Catalogue of Life.

The distribution of P. repens is: China (Guangdong, Guangxi, Hainan, Hong Kong), Laos and Vietnam. In Vietnamese it is called ráy bò or cơm ninh.
