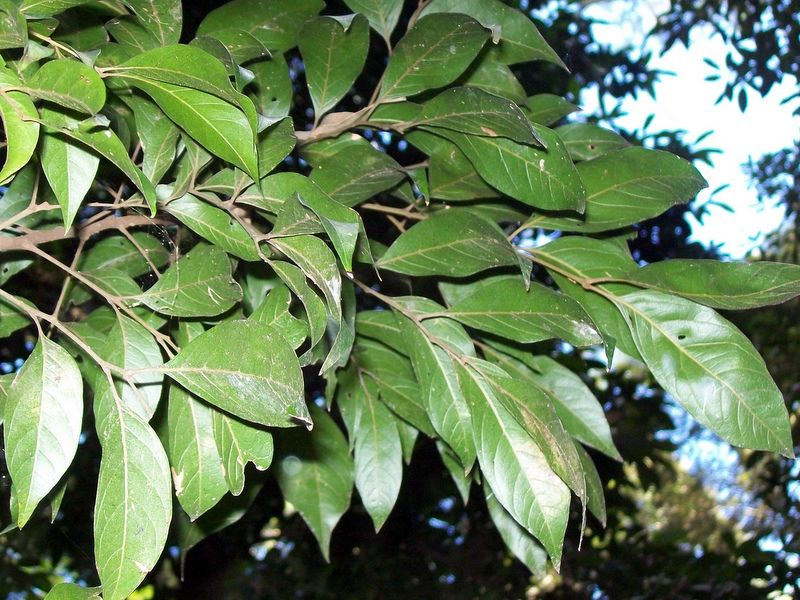
- Sarcopteryx stipata - leaves

Scientific classification
- Kingdom: Plantae
- Clade: Tracheophytes
- Clade: Angiosperms
- Clade: Eudicots
- Clade: Rosids
- Order: Sapindales
- Family: Sapindaceae
- Genus: Sarcopteryx
- Species: S. stipata

Binomial name
- Sarcopteryx stipata (F.Muell.) Radlk.

= Sarcopteryx stipata =

Steelwood

Species of tree

Sarcopteryx stipata, known as the steelwood, is a rainforest tree of eastern Australia occurring from the Bulga Plateau and Comboyne Plateau north west of Taree, New South Wales as far north as Fraser Island off the coast of south eastern Queensland. It grows in sub tropical rainforest but sometimes occurs in warm temperate rainforests on poorer soils. It is a member of the soap berry family. The generic name Sarcopteryx translates to "fleshy wing", as the fruit can be wing shaped. Stipata means "surrounded". The common name steelwood refers to the very tough, hard and heavy timber.

== Description ==
Usually seen as a small tree up to 10 metres in height, although a 40-metre-tall (130 ft) tree with a trunk diameter of 75 cm (30 in) was recorded at Griers Scrub in Nightcap National Park. The base of larger trees is somewhat flanged. Bark is hard and grey in colour, and often marked with irregularities such as wrinkles, horizontal bands and bumps. Small branches are thick, longitudinally ridged, and with soft brown hairs. Brown hairs occur on many parts of the plant.

=== Leaves ===
Compound leaves are 9 to 18 cm (3.5 to 7.1 in) long, with six leaflets, occasionally three to nine leaflets. Leaflets are 4 to 10 cm (1.6 to 3.9 in) long and 1.5 to 4 cm (0.59 to 1.57 in) wide, broad lanceolate in shape, narrowed at the base, and with a long fine leaf tip. The left and right halves of the leaflets are unequal in size. They are shiny green above, duller below with some brown hairs. The compound leaf stalk is brown and hairy, and swollen where it joins the branchlet. Leaflet stalks are between 3 and 12 mm (0.12 and 0.47 in) long, leaf veins are raised on both sides. Some lateral veins become wider and thicker where meeting the main mid rib of the leaf.

=== Flowers, fruit and germination ===
White or cream flowers appear from August to October on panicles, either at the end of the branchlets or from the axils of the leaves. Petals are 2 mm (0.079 in) long. The fruit is a red or pink capsule 13 mm (0.51 in) in diameter. It has three or four angles, with three cells, each containing one brown shiny cylindrical seed, 5 mm (0.20 in) in diameter. A yellow aril completely covers the seed. The fruit matures in November and December and is eaten by the green catbird and Lewin's honeyeater. Germination from fresh seed is slow but reliable - removal of the yellow aril from the seed is advised. After four months practically all seeds should germinate.
