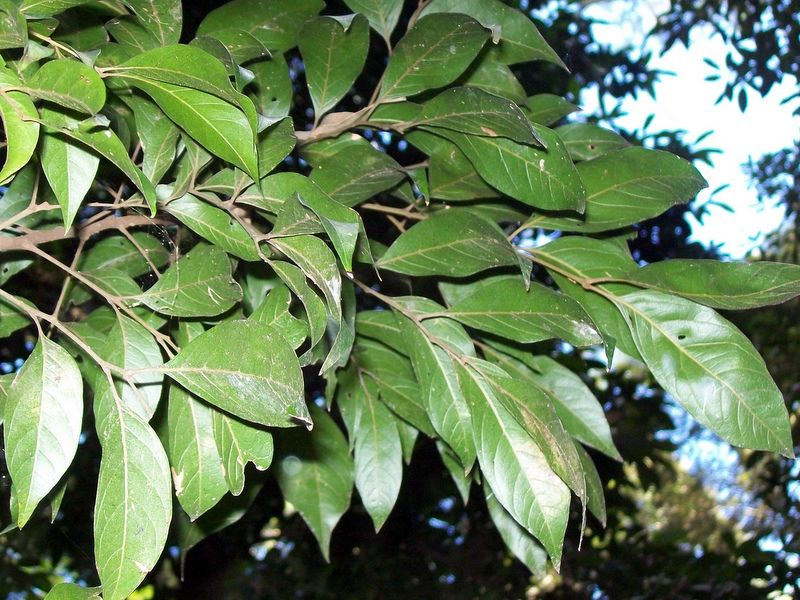
- Sarcopteryx stipata - Steelwood tree, eastern Australia

Scientific classification
- Kingdom: Plantae
- Clade: Tracheophytes
- Clade: Angiosperms
- Clade: Eudicots
- Clade: Rosids
- Order: Sapindales
- Family: Sapindaceae
- Tribe: Cupanieae
- Genus: Sarcopteryx; Radlk.

Species
- See text

= Sarcopteryx =

Genus of trees

Sarcopteryx is a genus of about 12 rainforest tree species known to science, of the plant family Sapindaceae. They occur in Australia, New Guinea and the Moluccas.

They have hairy leaves and twigs, polygamous flowers and bird attracting brightly coloured, capsule fruits.

The generic name Sarcopteryx translates to "fleshy wing", as the fruit can be angled, thick or wing shaped. The Greek sarco means fleshy, and pteron is "a wing".

== Species ==
- Sarcopteryx acuminata S.T.Reynolds – Qld, Australia
- Sarcopteryx brachyphylla Radlk. – New Guinea
- Sarcopteryx caudata Welzen – New Guinea
- Sarcopteryx coriacea Radlk. – Vogelkop Peninsula, New Guinea
- Sarcopteryx crispata Welzen – New Guinea
- Sarcopteryx martyana (F.Muell.) Radlk. – Qld, Australia
- Sarcopteryx montana S.T.Reynolds – Qld, Australia
- Sarcopteryx reticulata S.T.Reynolds – Qld, Australia
- Sarcopteryx rigida Radlk. – New Guinea
- Sarcopteryx rubiginosa Welzen – New Guinea
- Sarcopteryx squamosa (Roxb.) Radlk. – New Guinea
- Sarcopteryx stipata (F.Muell.) Radlk., steelwood, corduroy – Qld, NSW, Australia
