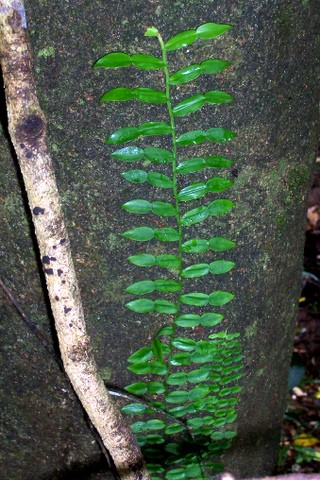
- At Booyong Flora Reserve, Australia

Scientific classification
- Kingdom: Plantae
- Clade: Tracheophytes
- Clade: Angiosperms
- Clade: Monocots
- Order: Alismatales
- Family: Araceae
- Genus: Pothos
- Species: P. longipes

Binomial name
- Pothos longipes Schott.

Synonyms
- Pothos brownii Domin.

= Pothos longipes =

Species of epiphyte

Pothos longipes is a climbing plant of the family Araceae native to the warmer rainforests of eastern Australia. It was first described in 1856 by the Austrian botanist Heinrich Wilhelm Schott. It ranges from Boorganna Nature Reserve in the Mid North Coast of New South Wales to tropical Queensland. It grows on the trunks of trees with a climbing or hemi-epiphytic habit. An attractive plant with interesting flowers and bright red fruit.

== Description ==
A slender, glossy leaved climber or hemi-epiphyte. Leaves 1.5 to 5 cm long, 5 to 15 mm wide. Leaves flattened, appearing constricted with an apparent wasp waist in the middle of the apparent leaf at the point where the flattened petiole meets the leaf blade itself.

Flowers form in late spring to early summer, being greenish or purple, featuring a lanceolate shaped spathe, 25 mm long. The spadix is yellowish and cylindrical, up to 6 cm long. Flowers usually solitary, on a 5 cm stem. The fruit is a red drupe, 8 to 13 mm long. Germination from fresh seed is not particularly difficult.

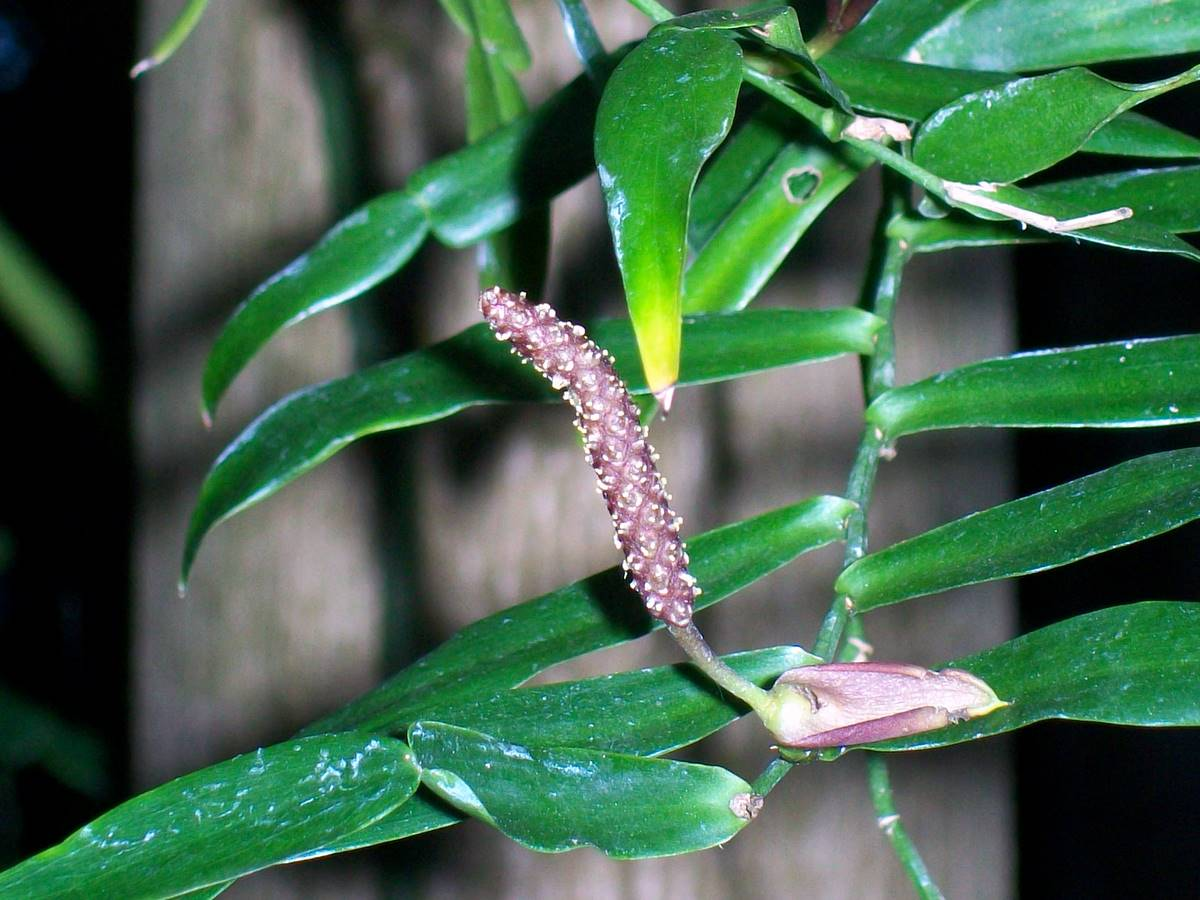
Pothos longipes - flower in the form of a spadix
