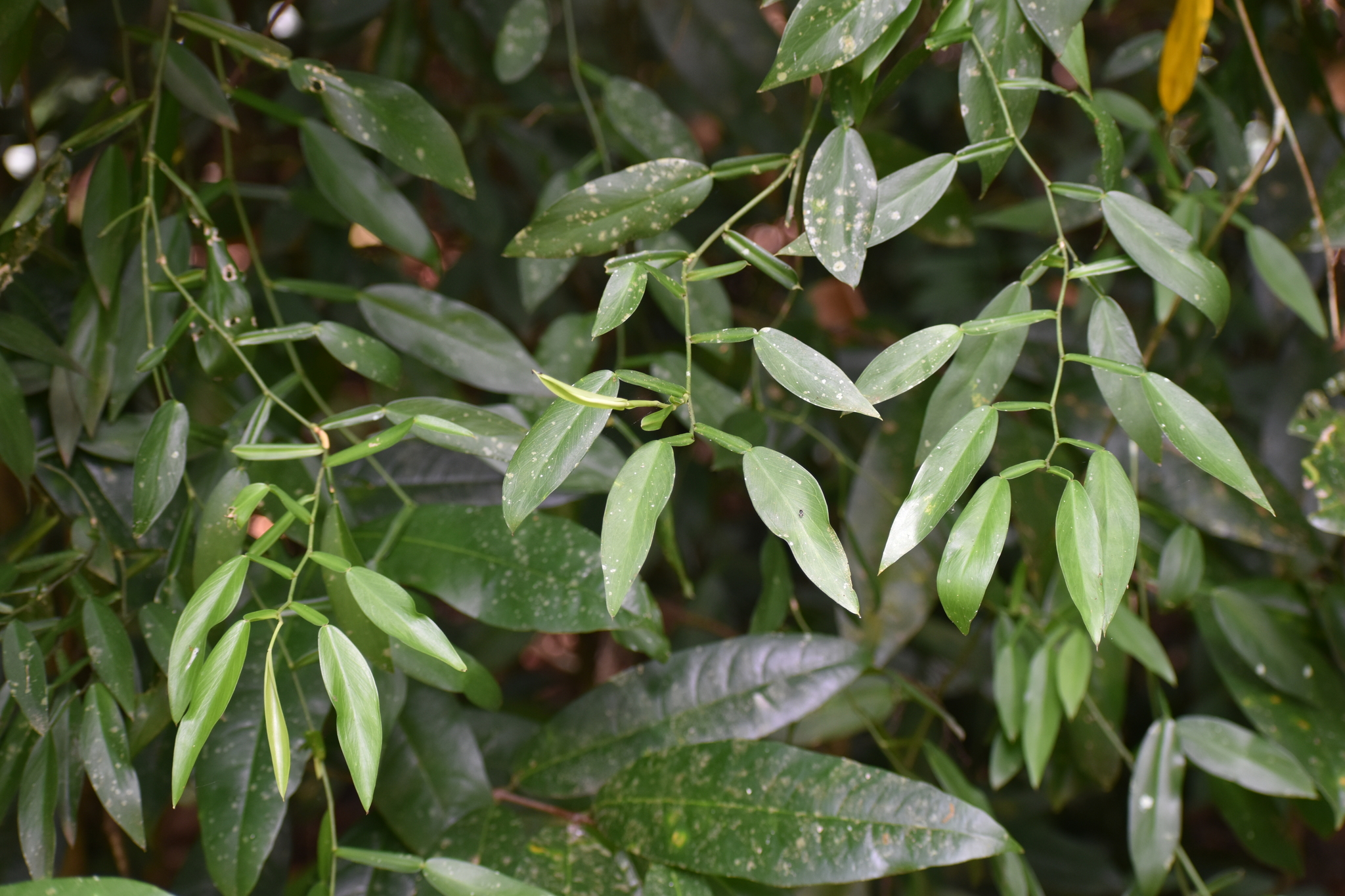

Scientific classification
- Kingdom: Plantae
- Clade: Tracheophytes
- Clade: Angiosperms
- Clade: Monocots
- Order: Alismatales
- Family: Araceae
- Genus: Pothos
- Species: P. chinensis

Binomial name
- Pothos chinensis (Raf.) Merr.

= Pothos chinensis =

Species of epiphyte

Pothos chinensis, also known as Chinese pothos, is a climbing plant species in the family Araceae, native to the Indian subcontinent, southern China, Taiwan, Southeast Asia, and the Nansei Islands of Japan. It is a root-climbing liana that can reach up to 10 m in length, with ovate to lanceolate leaves that show distinctive intramarginal venation. The plant produces green to white spathes with a globose to ovoid spadix, and its fruits ripen from green to scarlet. It occurs primarily in wet tropical biomes and flowers and fruits throughout the year.
