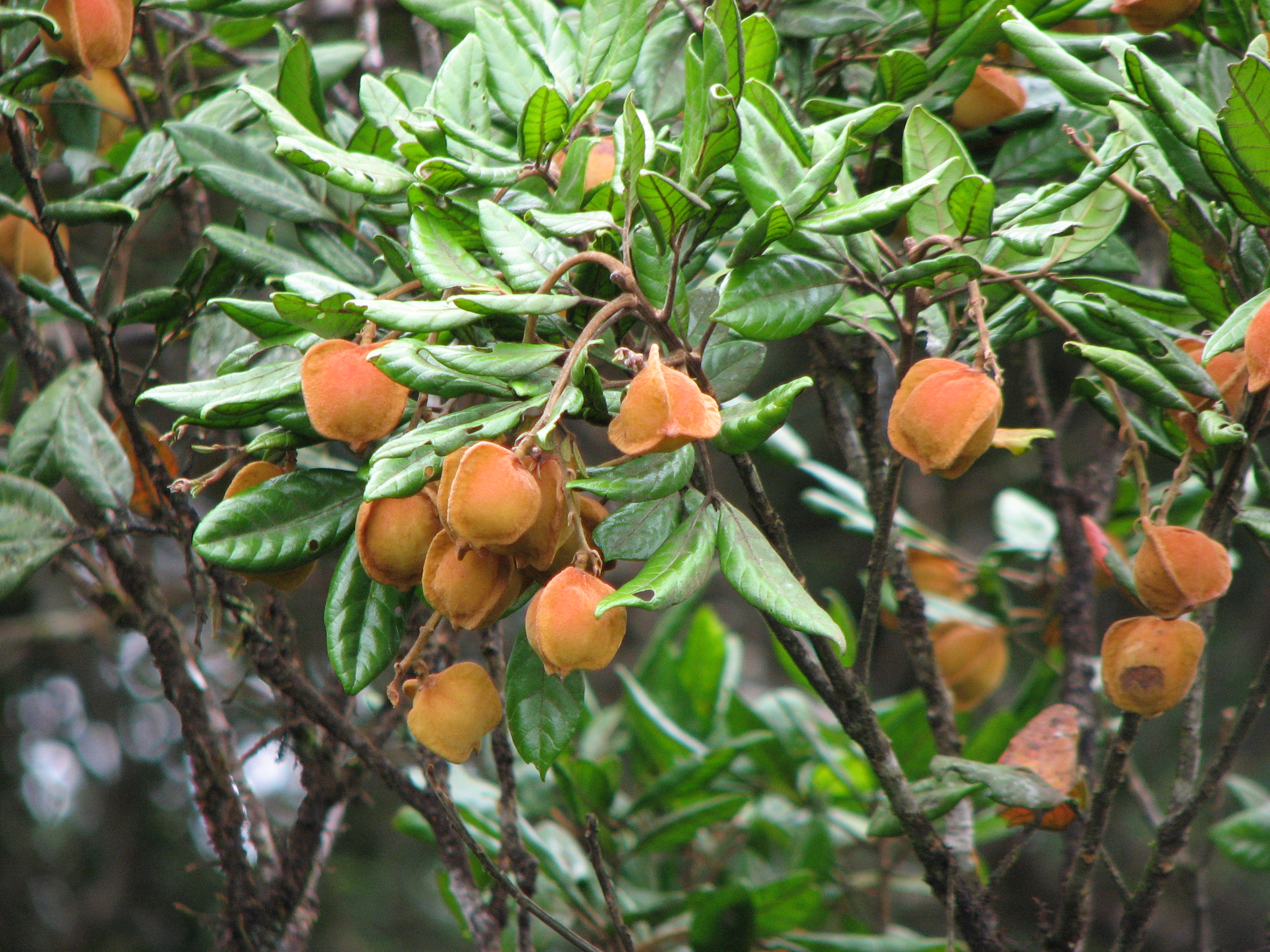

Scientific classification
- Kingdom: Plantae
- Clade: Tracheophytes
- Clade: Angiosperms
- Clade: Eudicots
- Clade: Rosids
- Order: Sapindales
- Family: Sapindaceae
- Genus: Sarcopteryx
- Species: S. montana

Binomial name
- Sarcopteryx montana S.T.Reynolds

= Sarcopteryx montana =

Species of tree

Sarcopteryx montana is a species of rainforest tree in north-eastern Queensland, Australia. The Latin specific epithet montana refers to mountains or coming from mountains.
