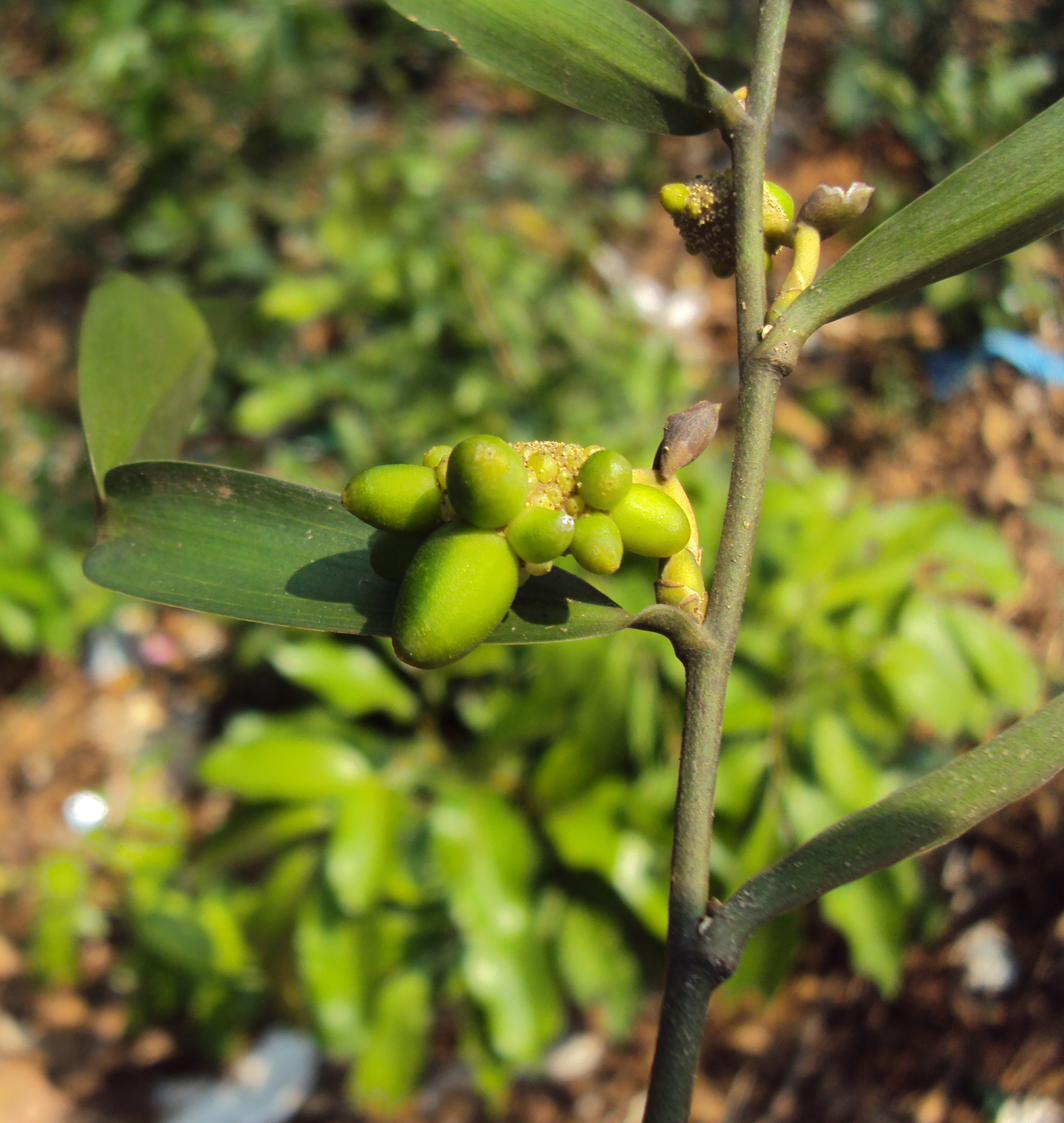

Scientific classification
- Kingdom: Plantae
- Clade: Tracheophytes
- Clade: Angiosperms
- Clade: Monocots
- Order: Alismatales
- Family: Araceae
- Subfamily: Pothoideae
- Tribe: Potheae
- Genus: Pothos
- Species: P. scandens

Binomial name
- Pothos scandens Linnaeus

Synonyms
- Tapanava rheedei Hassk. Tapanava indica Raf. Pothos zollingerianus Schott; Pothos zollingeri Engl. Pothos scandens var. zollingerianus Pothos scandens var. zeylanicus Pothos scandens var. sumatranus Pothos scandens var. helferianus Pothos scandens var. cognatus Pothos scandens f. angustior Pothos microphyllus C.Presl; Pothos longifolius C.Presl; Pothos leptospadix de Vriese; Pothos horsfieldii Miq. Pothos hermaphroditus (Blanco) Merr. Pothos fallax Schott; Pothos exiguiflorus Schott; Pothos decipiens Schott; Pothos cognatus Schott; Pothos chapelieri Schott; Pothos angustifolius Reinw. ex Miq. Pothos angustifolius (Raf.) C.Presl; Podospadix angustifolia Raf. Batis hermaphrodita Blanco

= Pothos scandens =

Species of flowering plant

Pothos scandens is a climbing tropical forest plant in the calla lily family Araceae. It is the type species of the genus Pothos. No subspecies are recorded in the Catalogue of Life. Its leaves are like those of the makrut lime Citrus hystrix, with the petiole expanded into a cladode with a single terminal leaflet

The distribution of P. scandens is: Bangladesh, Brunei, Cambodia, China (Yunnan), Comoros, India (including Andaman and Nicobar Islands), Indonesia (Java, Kalimantan, Maluku, Nusa Tenggara, Sumatera), Laos, Madagascar, Malaysia (Peninsular Malaysia and Sabah), Myanmar, Philippines, Seychelles, Sri Lanka, Thailand and Vietnam. In Vietnamese it is called tràng phao dây or ráy leo.

== Gallery ==
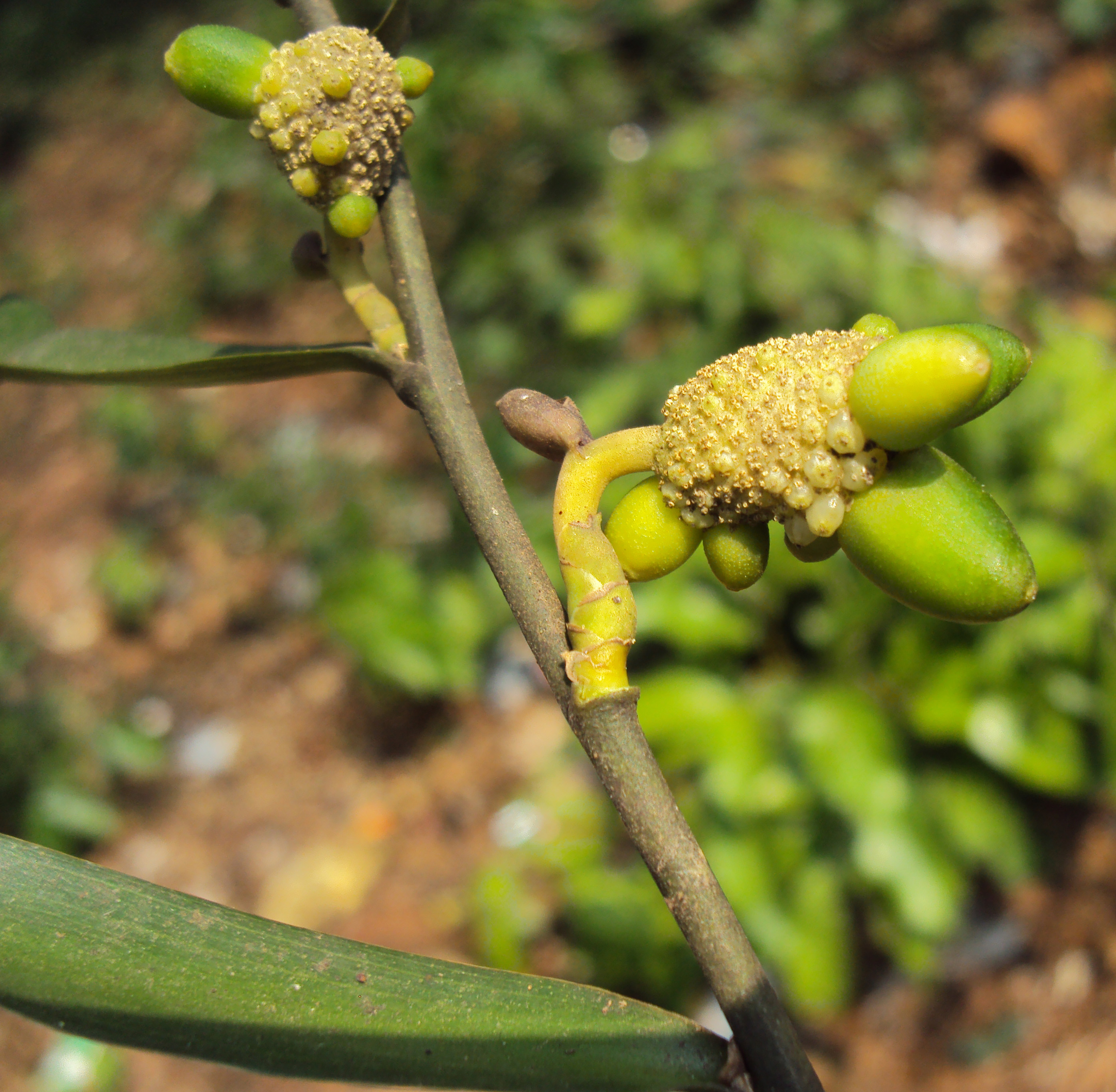

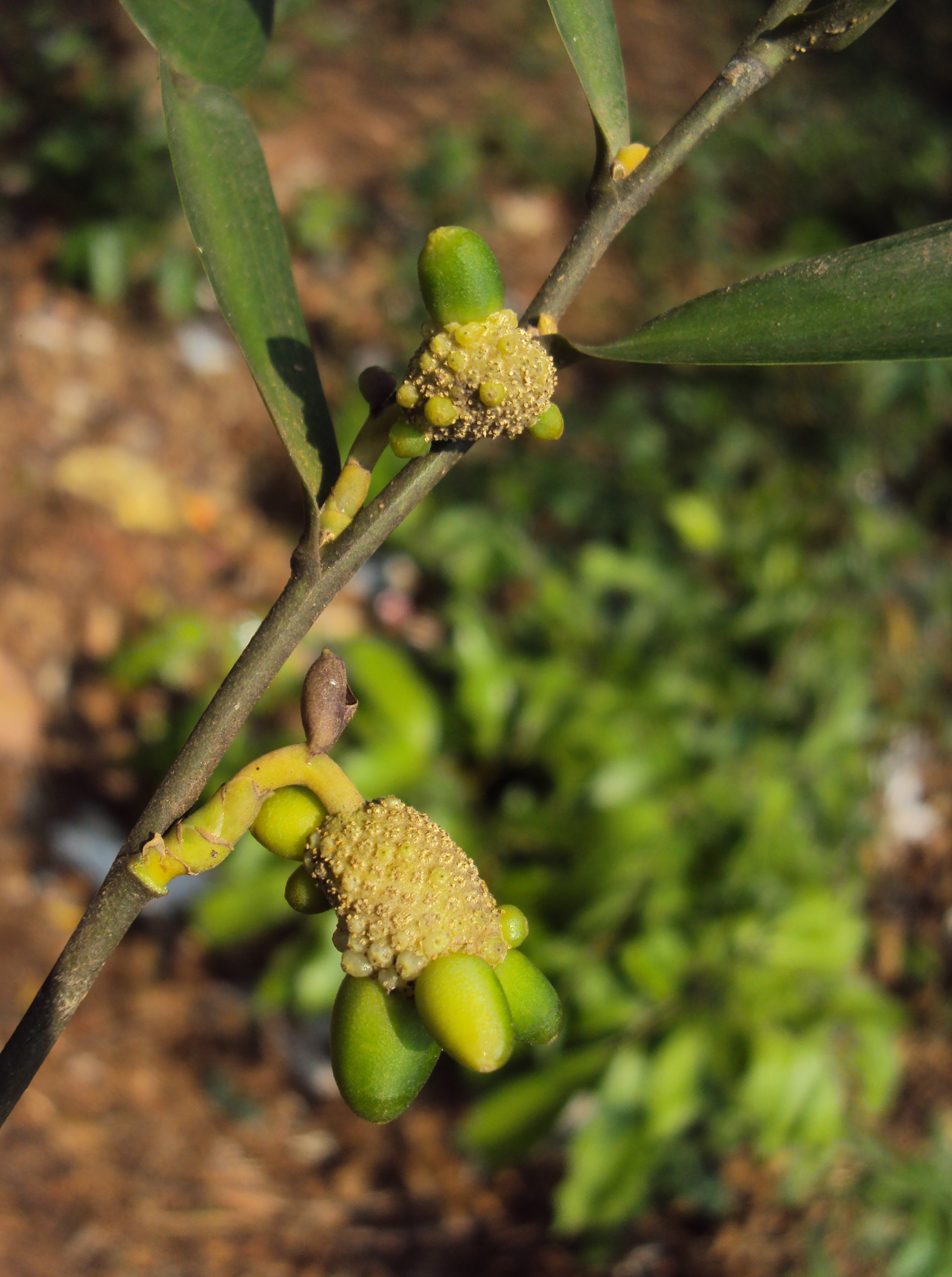

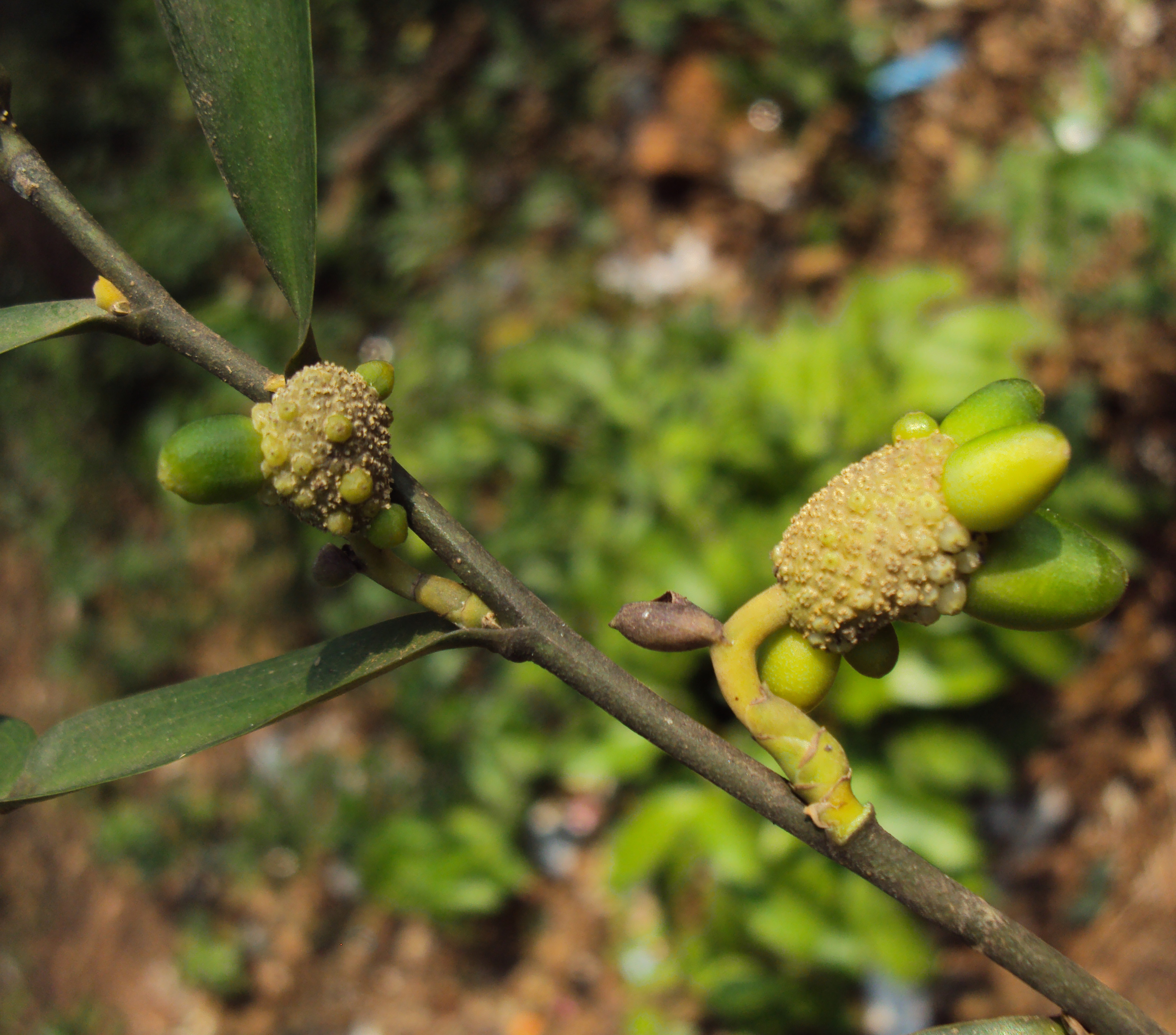

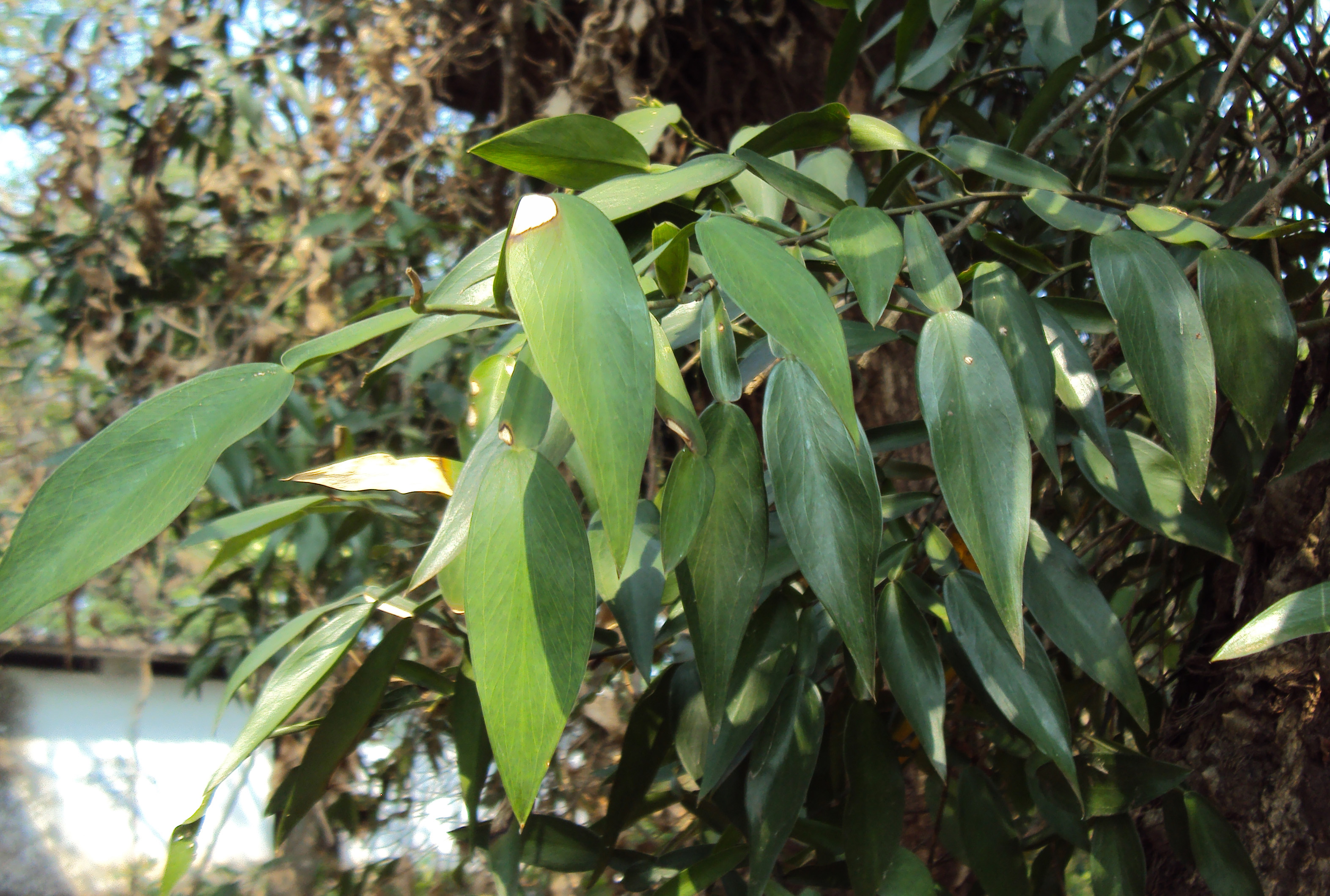
