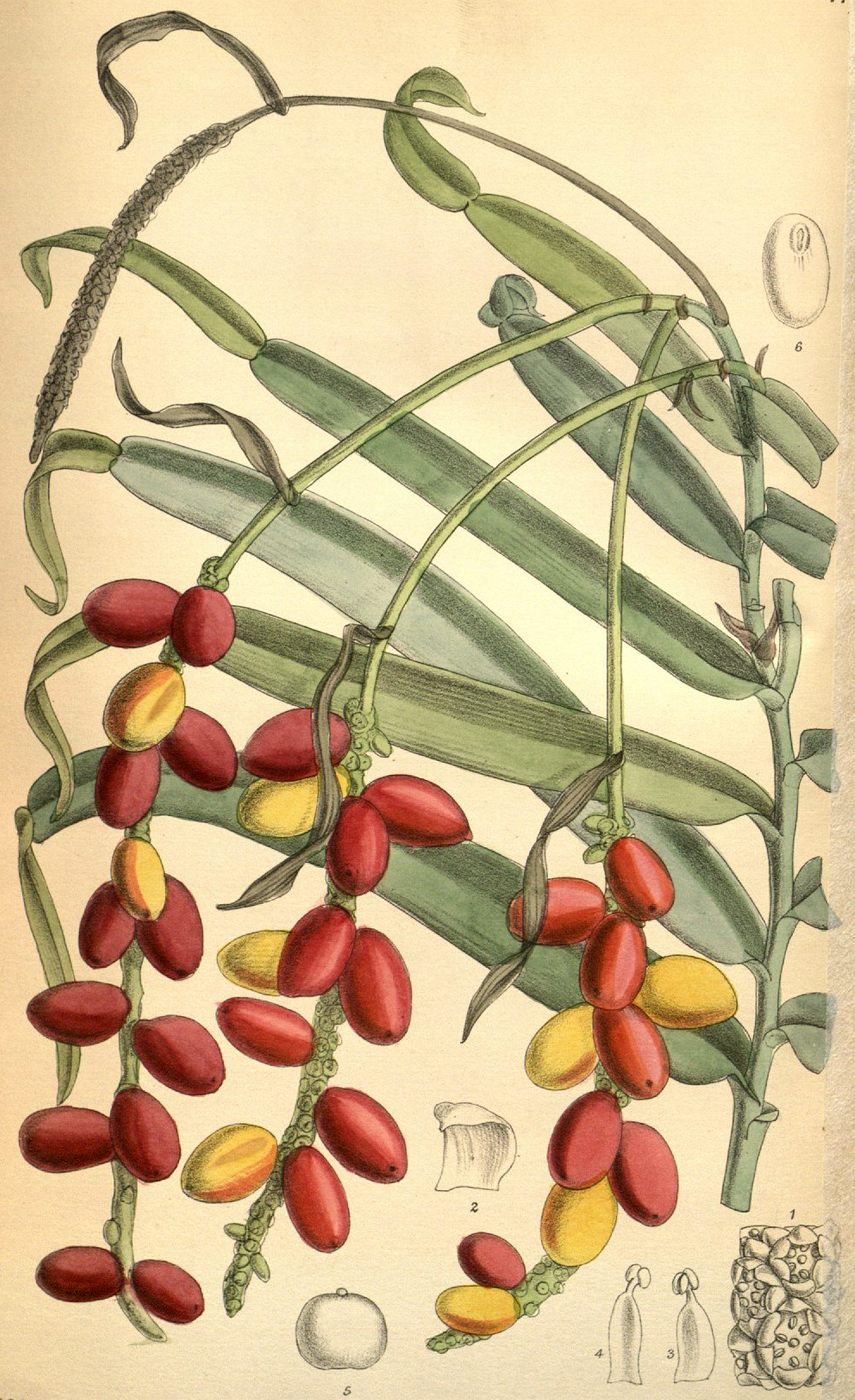
- Pothos repens 1900 illustration

Scientific classification
- Kingdom: Plantae
- Clade: Tracheophytes
- Clade: Angiosperms
- Clade: Monocots
- Order: Alismatales
- Family: Araceae
- Tribe: Potheae
- Genus: Pothos; L.

Synonyms
- Batis Blanco; Goniurus C.Presl; Pedicellarum M.Hotta; Tapanava Adans.

= Pothos (plant) =

Genus of plants

Pothos is a genus of flowering plants in the family Araceae (tribe Potheae). It is native to areas from Madagascar through India, China and Southeast Asia to Australia and the southwest Pacific.

The common houseplant Epipremnum aureum, commonly known as 'pothos', was once classified under this genus.

== Description ==
Pothos species are evergreen climbing plants, commonly growing as hemiepiphytes in tropical forests. They have woody stems and leaves arranged in two rows along the stem. Their inflorescences consist of a spadix, which can be spherical or cylindrical.

== Distribution ==
Pothos is native to the following regions as defined in the World Geographical Scheme for Recording Plant Distributions:

- Western Indian Ocean – Comoros, Madagascar, Réunion (doubtful), Seychelles
- China – China South-Central, China Southeast, Hainan, Tibet
- Eastern Asia – Nansei-shoto, Taiwan
- Indian Subcontinent – Assam, Bangladesh, East Himalaya, India, Nepal, Sri Lanka, West Himalaya
- Indo-China – Andaman Is., Cambodia, Laos, Myanmar, Nicobar Is., Thailand, Vietnam
- Malesia – Borneo, Jawa, Lesser Sunda Is., Malaya, Maluku, Philippines, Sulawesi, Sumatera
- Papuasia – Bismarck Archipelago, New Guinea, Solomon Is.
- Australia – New South Wales, Queensland
- Southwestern Pacific – Vanuatu

== Species ==
As of October 2026, Plants of the World Online accepts the following 66 species:

- Pothos armatus C.E.C.Fisch. – Kerala
- Pothos atropurpurascens M.Hotta – Borneo
- Pothos barberianus Schott– Borneo, Malaysia, Sumatra
- Pothos beccarianus Engl. – Borneo
- Pothos boyceanus G.Rajkumar, Shaju, Nazarudeen & Prakashk. – India (Kerala)
- Pothos brassii B.L.Burtt – Queensland
- Pothos brevistylus Engl. – Borneo
- Pothos brevivaginatus Alderw. – Sumatra
- Pothos chinensis (Raf.) Merr. – China, Tibet, Taiwan, Japan, Ryukyu Islands, Indochina, Himalayas, India, Nepal, Bhutan
- Pothos clavatus Engl. – New Guinea
- Pothos crassipedunculatus Sivad. & N.Mohanan – southern India
- Pothos curtisii Hook.f. – Thailand, Malaysia, Sumatra
- Pothos cuspidatus Alderw. – western New Guinea
- Pothos cylindricus C.Presl – Sabah, Sulawesi, Philippines
- Pothos degenerans S.Y.Wong, P.C.Boyce & A.Hay – Borneo (Sarawak, Kalimantan)
- Pothos deleonii Medecilo & Cabactulan
- Pothos dolichophyllus Merr. – Philippines
- Pothos dzui P.C.Boyce – Vietnam
- Pothos ecclesiae P.C.Boyce, S.Y.Wong & A.Hay
- Pothos englerianus (Engl.) Alderw. – Sumatra
- Pothos falcifolius Engl. & K.Krause – Maluku, New Guinea
- Pothos fractiflexus Joling, J.T.Pereira & Damit – Borneo (Sabah)
- Pothos gigantipes Buchet ex P.C.Boyce – Vietnam, Cambodia
- Pothos gracillimus Engl. & K.Krause – Papua New Guinea
- Pothos grandis Buchet ex P.C.Boyce & V.D.Nguyen – Vietnam
- Pothos hellwigii Engl. – New Guinea, Solomon Islands, Bismarck Archipelago
- Pothos hookeri Schott – Sri Lanka
- Pothos inaequilaterus (C.Presl) Engl. – Philippines
- Pothos insignis Engl. – Borneo, Palawan
- Pothos junghuhnii de Vriese – Borneo, Java, Sumatra
- Pothos keralensis A.G. Pandurangan & V.J. Nair – Kerala
- Pothos kerrii Buchet ex P.C.Boyce – Guangxi, Laos, Vietnam
- Pothos kingii Hook.f. – Thailand, Peninsular Malaysia
- Pothos lancifolius Hook.f. – Vietnam, Peninsular Malaysia
- Pothos laurifolius P.C.Boyce & A.Hay – Brunei
- Pothos leptostachyus Schott – Thailand, Peninsular Malaysia, Borneo, Sumatra
- Pothos longipes Schott – Queensland, New South Wales
- Pothos longivaginatus Alderw. – Borneo
- Pothos luzonensis (C.Presl) Schott – Luzon, Samar
- Pothos macrocephalus Scort. ex Hook.f. – Nicobar Islands, Thailand, Peninsular Malaysia, Sumatra
- Pothos mirabilis Merr. – Sabah, Kalimantan Timur
- Pothos motleyanus Schott – Kalimantan
- Pothos oliganthus P.C.Boyce & A.Hay – Sarawak
- Pothos ovatifolius Engl. – Peninsular Malaysia, Borneo, Sumatra, Philippines
- Pothos oxyphyllus Miq. – Borneo, Sumatra, Java
- Pothos paiei (M.Hotta) S.Y.Wong, A.Hay & P.C.Boyce – Borneo
- Pothos papuanus Becc. ex Engl. – New Guinea, Solomon Islands
- Pothos parvispadix Nicolson – Sri Lanka
- Pothos philippinensis Engl. – Philippines
- Pothos pilulifer Buchet ex P.C.Boyce – Yunnan, Guangxi, Vietnam
- Pothos polystachyus Engl. & K.Krause – Papua New Guinea
- Pothos pugnax P.C.Boyce & S.Y.Wong
- Pothos remotiflorus Hook. – Sri Lanka
- Pothos repens (Lour.) Druce – Guangdong, Guangxi, Hainan, Yunnan, Laos, Vietnam
- Pothos roxburghii de Vriese – Indian subcontinent, Myanmar, Thailand, Peninsular Malaysia
- Pothos salicifolius Ridl. ex Burkill & Holttum – Peninsular Malaysia
- Pothos scandens L. – Indian subcontinent, Indo–China, Malesia
- Pothos tener (Roxb.) Wall. – Maluku, Sulawesi, New Guinea, Solomon Islands, Bismarck Archipelago, Vanuatu
- Pothos thomsonianus Schott – southern India
- Pothos tirunelveliensis Sasikala & Reema Kumari – India (Tamil Nadu)
- Pothos touranensis Gagnep. – Vietnam
- Pothos venustus (Wall. ex C.DC.) A.Hay & P.C.Boyce – Singapore
- Pothos versteegii Engl. – New Guinea
- Pothos vietnamensis V.D.Nguyen & P.C.Boyce – Vietnam
- Pothos volans P.C.Boyce & A.Hay – Brunei, Sarawak
- Pothos zippelii Schott – Maluku, New Guinea, Solomon Islands, Bismarck Archipelago
