= Pigeonberry ash =

Pigeonberry ash is a common name for multiple flowering plants, in different families and orders from each other and from true ash trees, and may refer to:

- Cryptocarya erythroxylon
- Elaeocarpus kirtonii
