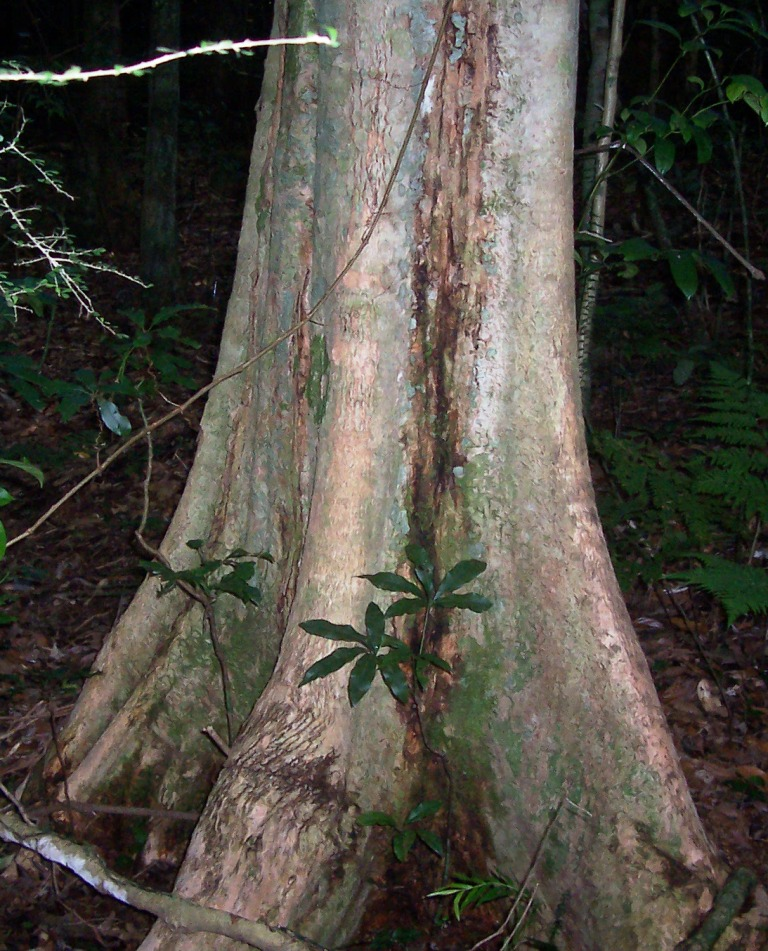
- Syzygium corynanthum Boorganna Nature Reserve near Taree, New South Wales, Australia.

Scientific classification
- Kingdom: Plantae
- Clade: Tracheophytes
- Clade: Angiosperms
- Clade: Eudicots
- Clade: Rosids
- Order: Myrtales
- Family: Myrtaceae
- Genus: Syzygium
- Species: S. corynanthum

Binomial name
- Syzygium corynanthum (F.Muell.) L.A.S.Johnson

Synonyms
- Eugenia corynantha F.Muell.

= Syzygium corynanthum =

Species of tree

Syzygium corynanthum, commonly known as sour cherry and Killarney satinash, is a common Australian tree which grows in surrounding areas from Taree, New South Wales (31 ° S) to tropical Queensland.The habitat of Syzygium corynanthum is rainforest on basaltic or fertile alluvial soils.

== Description ==
Syzygium corynanthum is a medium size tree, which can reach 30 metres in height and a 90 cm in trunk diameter. The tree's crown appears dark and full.

The bark is grey and scaly, with numerous depressions caused by the shedding of bark scales. Syzygium corynanthum are slightly buttressed at the base.

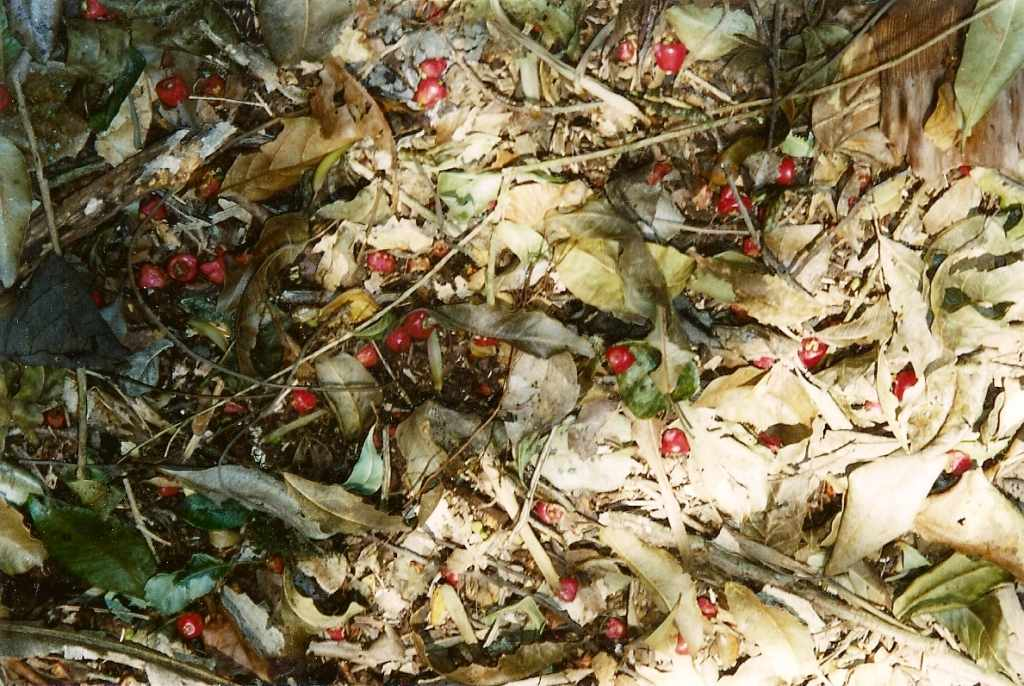
Syzygium corynanthum, fruit on the rainforest floor, League Scrub, west of Nambucca Heads.

=== Leaves, flowers and fruit ===
The leaves are opposite, simple and entire with numerous oil dots, about five diameters apart of different sizes. Leaf stalks are 6mm long. Flowers are in short dense panicles. Petals are cream, four in number and appear from April to July.

The fruit matures from September to December, being a red berry, broader towards the tip than at the base. Four persistent calyx lobes surround the base of the fruit, from which the style usually protrudes. The taste of the fruit is not particularly sour, as the common name might suggest.

Seed germination is slow, commencing at 40 days, and completing after 200 days. The fruit is prone to insect attacks. Soaking the seeds is recommended to drown insect larvae. The fruit is eaten by many rainforest birds, including the wompoo fruit dove and catbird.
