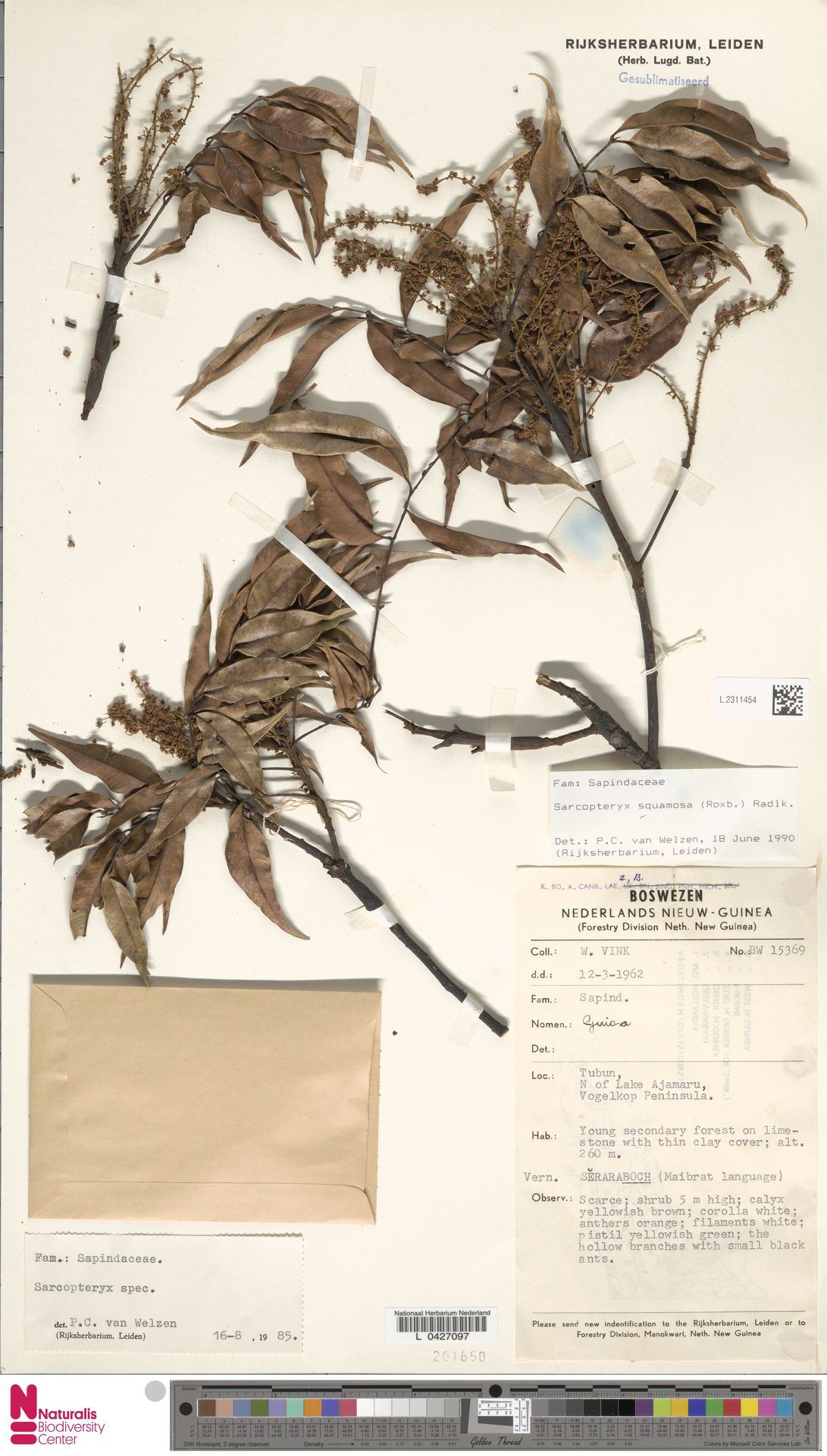
- Herbarium specimen

Scientific classification
- Kingdom: Plantae
- Clade: Tracheophytes
- Clade: Angiosperms
- Clade: Eudicots
- Clade: Rosids
- Order: Sapindales
- Family: Sapindaceae
- Genus: Sarcopteryx
- Species: S. squamosa

Binomial name
- Sarcopteryx squamosa (Roxb.) Radlk.

= Sarcopteryx squamosa =

Species of tree

Sarcopteryx squamosa is a species of rainforest tree of the family Sapindaceae. It is found in New Guinea and the islands of Maluku.
