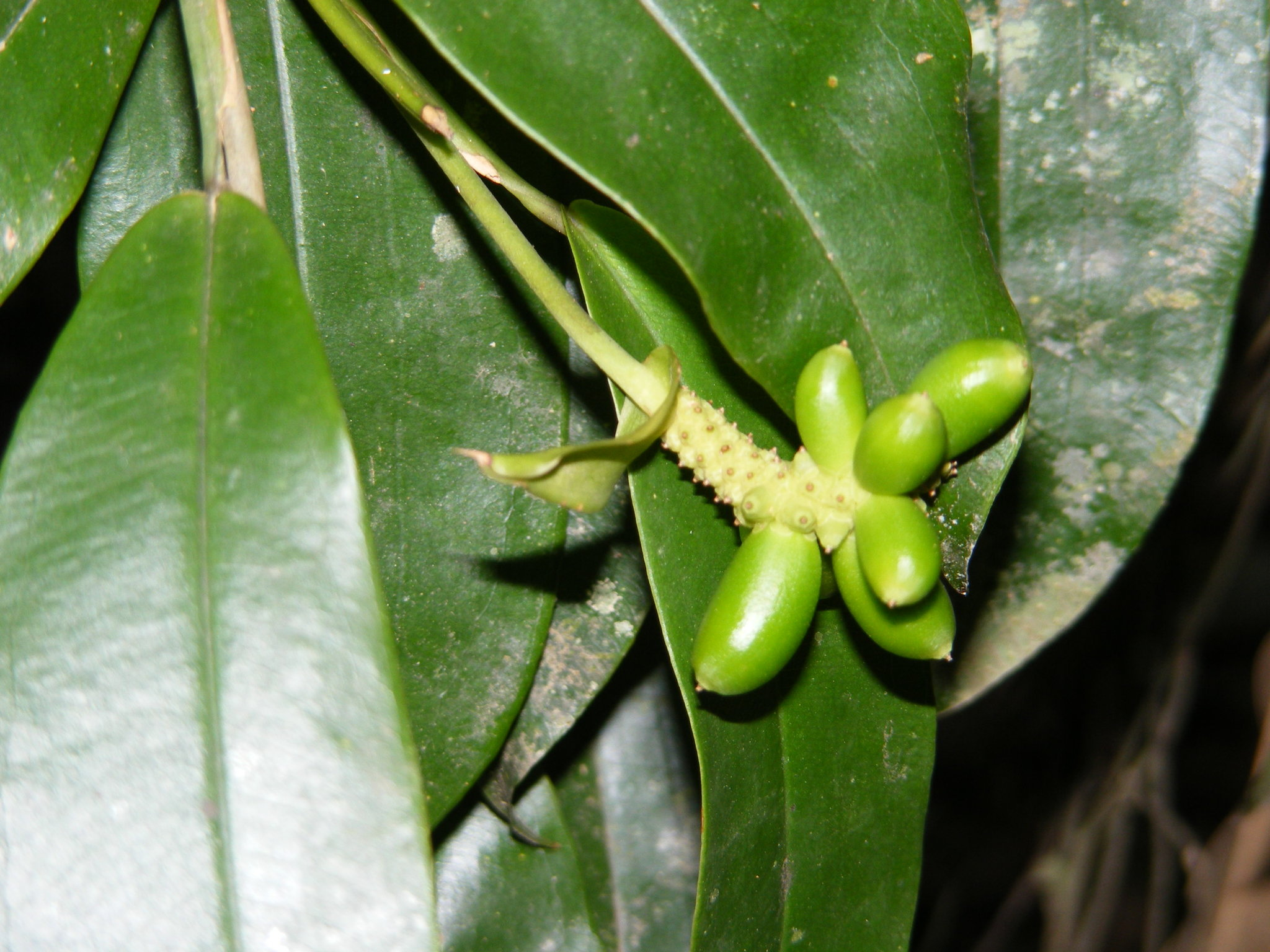
- Fruit

Conservation status
- Least Concern (NCA)

Scientific classification
- Kingdom: Plantae
- Clade: Tracheophytes
- Clade: Angiosperms
- Clade: Monocots
- Order: Alismatales
- Family: Araceae
- Genus: Pothos
- Species: P. brassii

Binomial name
- Pothos brassii B.L.Burtt

= Pothos brassii =

Species of flowering plant

Pothos brassii is a species of plant in the arum family Araceae. It is native to the Wet Tropics bioregion of Queensland, Australia. It is a root climber with a stem not exceeding 2 cm (0.79 in) diameter. It was first described in 1936 and has the conservation status of least concern.
