= Benthamina =

Scientific classification
- Kingdom: Plantae
- Clade: Tracheophytes
- Clade: Angiosperms
- Clade: Eudicots
- Order: Santalales
- Family: Loranthaceae
- Genus: Benthamina; Tiegh.

Genus of flowering plants

Benthamina is a genus of flowering plants belonging to the family Loranthaceae.

Its native range is Eastern Australia.

Species:

- Benthamina alyxifolia (F.Muell. ex Benth.) Tiegh.
