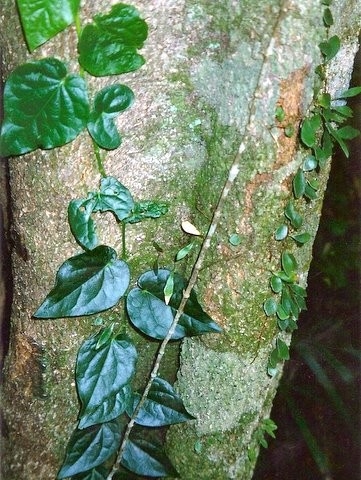
- Giant pepper vine on a black apple tree near Foxground, Australia

Scientific classification
- Kingdom: Plantae
- Clade: Tracheophytes
- Clade: Angiosperms
- Clade: Magnoliids
- Order: Piperales
- Family: Piperaceae
- Genus: Piper
- Species: P. novae-hollandiae

Binomial name
- Piper novae-hollandiae Miq.

= Piper novae-hollandiae =

Giant pepper vine

Species of flowering plant

Piper novae-hollandiae, known as the giant pepper vine, is a common climber growing in rainforests of eastern Australia. It is related to the pepper plant. It grows north from Mount Dromedary in southern New South Wales to tropical Queensland.

First described by Dutch botanist Friedrich Anton Wilhelm Miquel in 1866, its specific name pertains to its location in New Holland (Australia).

The giant pepper vine is a vigorous and rapid-growing climbing plant with stems that become woody and covered in rough, grey bark. At its most advanced stage of development, the stem can be 40 cm (16 in) thick at the base, and may reach 30–40 meters in length, but the record is 230 feet (70 meters). Curtains of its leaves may sometimes be seen suspended from large rainforest trees. When in the juvenile stage, its leaves are thin and ovate, measuring roughly 8 cm by 8 cm). Also ovate, mature leaves – referred to as "sun leaves" — are thicker and larger. They are a deep green color with visible Veins, and measure approximately 12 cm by 8 cm.

The small, cream-colored flowers of the giant pepper vine occur from April to August. Male flowers are arranged on a cylindrical spike, while the spike of females is more ovular. Both male and female flowers occur on a single given plant. Flowering is followed by a 0.5 cm, oval-shaped, red, fleshy drupe, which provides food to rainforest wildlife.

== Uses ==
The giant pepper vine is usually ornamental when cultivated – it grows too rapidly and to too great a volume for the average home garden – but has been used in larger parks and gardens, and as an indoor plant.
