= White apple =

White apple is a common name for several flowering plants, neither in the apple/rose family, Rosaceae, and may refer to:

- Endiandra virens, native to Australia
- Syzygium forte, native to Australia
