= Nature reserve (Australia) =

Protected area designation in some Australian states

Nature reserve (Australia) is the title of a type of protected area used in the Australian jurisdictions of the Australian Capital Territory, New South Wales, Tasmania and Western Australia. The term “nature reserve” is defined by state and territory statutes rather than by a single national statute. As of 2014, 1767 (or 17%) out of a total of 10339 protected areas listed within the Australian National Reserve System were “nature reserves.”

== Extent of use on Australia ==
The term “nature reserves” is only used in the Australian Capital Territory, New South Wales, Tasmania and Western Australia.

As of 2014, 1767 protected areas whose titles include the words “nature reserve” have been listed on the National Reserve System with a total area of 113,382.42 hectares (280,174.1 acres) or 1.47% of the Australian territorial area. This compares with the National Reserve System’s total inventory of 10339 protected areas that have a total area of 1,375,015.51 square kilometres (530,896.46 square miles) or 17.88% of the Australian territorial area.

== Australian Capital Territory ==
In the Australian Capital Territory, the term “nature reserve” appears in the following legislation - the Nature Conservation Act 2014 and the Planning and Development Act 2007 with the former defining the term as “an area of public land reserved in the territory plan for a nature reserve under the Planning and Development Act 2007” while the latter defines it as one of the purposes for which “public land may be reserved in the territory plan.”

As of 2014, a total of 43 nature reserves are listed as part of the National Reserve System with a total area of 234.71 square kilometres (90.62 square miles).

== New South Wales ==
In New South Wales, a nature reserve is defined by the National Parks and Wildlife Act 1974 as land being reserved to “identify, protect and conserve areas containing outstanding, unique or representative ecosystems, species, communities or natural phenomena.”

As of 2014, a total of 418 nature reserves have been listed as part of the New South Wales contribution to the National Reserve System with a total area of 9,514.67 square kilometres (3,673.63 square miles).

== Tasmania ==
In Tasmania, a nature reserve is defined in two statutes - the Nature Conservation Act 2002 and the National Parks and Reserves Management Act 2002. The first statute defines a nature reserve in respect to “an area of land” as “the conservation of the natural biological diversity or geological diversity of the area of land, or both, and the conservation of the natural values of that area of land that are unique, important or have representative value.” The second statute includes a list of seven objectives for the management of nature reserves concerned with matters such as “natural biological diversity”, “geological diversity”, water quality & catchment protection, “sites or areas of cultural significance”, education, research, protection & rehabilitation, and engagement with Aboriginal people.

As of 2014, a total of 80 nature reserves have been listed as part of the Tasmanian contribution to the National Reserve System with a total area of 1,107.75 square kilometres (427.70 square miles).

== Western Australia ==
In Western Australia, a nature reserve is defined in the Conservation and Land Management Act 1984 as being used for land which has been vested in a government agency known as the Conservation Commission either by a person or persons, or by other state legislation where land has been reserved for “ the conservation of flora or fauna, or both flora and fauna.”

As of 2014, a total of 1226 nature reserves have been listed as part of the Western Australian contribution to the National Reserve System with a total area of 102,525.28 square kilometres (39,585.23 square miles).

== See also ==
- Indigenous Protected Area
- Protected areas of Australia
