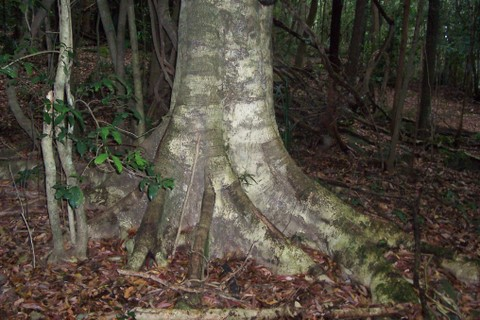
- Elaeocarpus kirtonii growing at Morton National Park

Scientific classification
- Kingdom: Plantae
- Clade: Tracheophytes
- Clade: Angiosperms
- Clade: Eudicots
- Clade: Rosids
- Order: Oxalidales
- Family: Elaeocarpaceae
- Genus: Elaeocarpus
- Species: E. kirtonii

Binomial name
- Elaeocarpus kirtonii F.Muell. ex F.M.Bailey

Synonyms
- Elaeocarpus baeuerlenii Joseph Maiden & R.T.Baker; Elaeocarpus longifolius C.Moore; Elaeocarpus longifolius C.Moore nom. illeg.; Elaeocarpus reticulata var. kirtoni Ewart & Jean White orth. var.; Elaeocarpus reticulatus var. kirtonii (F.M.Bailey) Ewart & Jean White; Elaeocarpus reticulatus var. longifolius Domin

= Elaeocarpus kirtonii =

Silver quandong

Species of flowering plant endemic to Australia

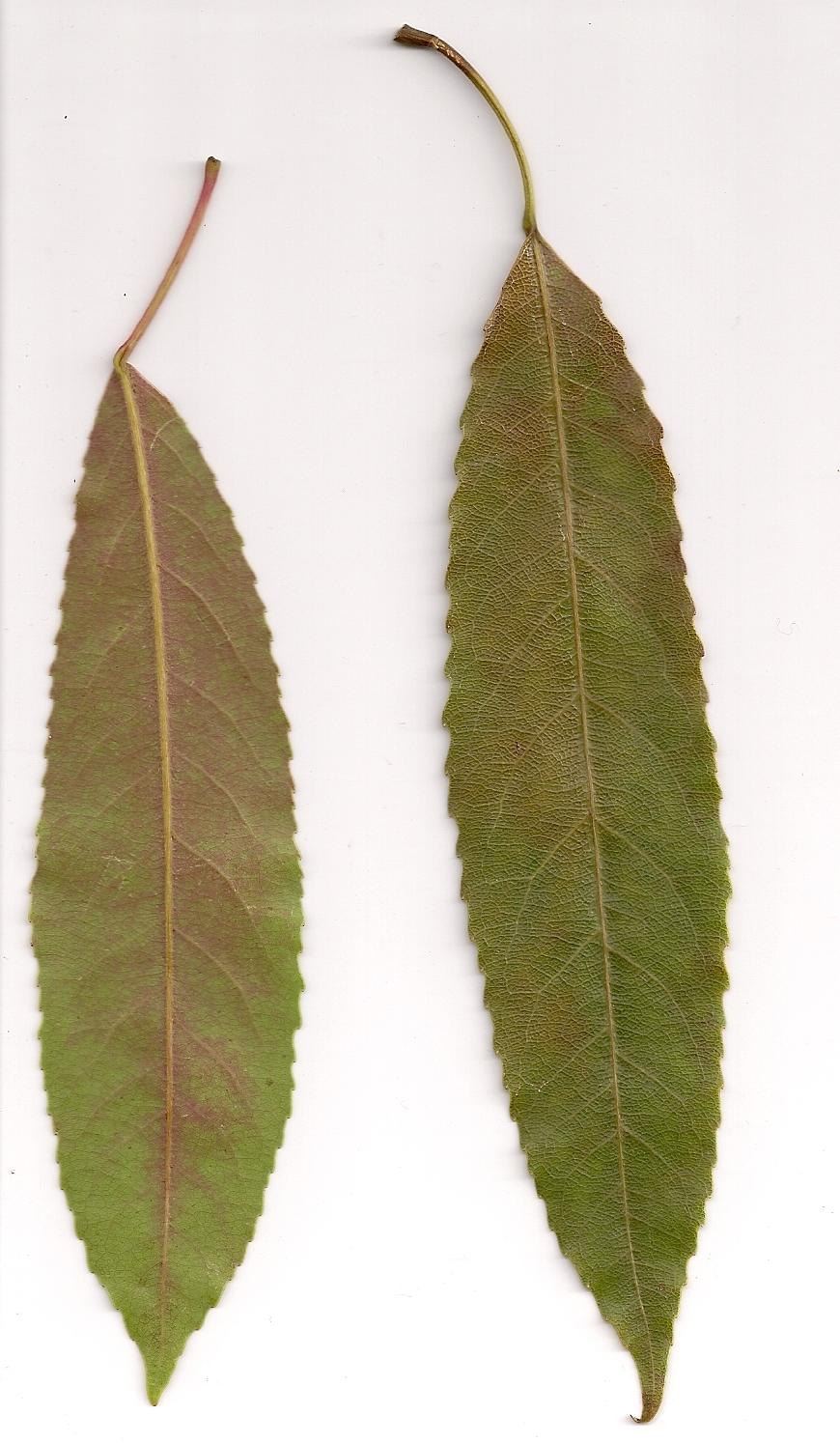
Leaves

Elaeocarpus kirtonii, commonly known as silver quandong, white quandong, brown hearted quandong, brownheart, mountain beech, Mowbullan whitewood, pigeonberry ash, white beech or whitewood, is species of flowering plant in the family Elaeocarpaceae and is endemic to eastern Australia. It is a large rainforest tree with buttress roots, regularly toothed, narrow elliptic to narrow oblong leaves, racemes of white flowers and pale blue, oval fruits.

== Description ==
Elaeocarpus kirtonii is a large and often dominant tree, typically growing to a height of 30 m (98 ft) with a diameter of about 1 m (3 ft 3 in), but sometimes to 45 m (148 ft) and 2 m (6 ft 7 in) diameter. There are buttress roots to a height of 3 m (9.8 ft) and the outer bark is silvery grey and thin, with small pustules. New growth is salmon-pink, the leaves clustered near the ends of the branchlets, narrow elliptic to narrow oblong, 70–200 mm (2.8–7.9 in) long and 20–40 mm (0.79–1.57 in) wide on a petiole 15–50 mm (0.59–1.97 in) long. The leaves are dull green with prominent veins, regularly spaced teeth on the edges and turn red before falling. The flowers are arranged along racemes mostly 60–100 mm (2.4–3.9 in) long with between fifteen and twenty sweet-scented flowers, each on a pedicel up to 6–10 mm (0.24–0.39 in) long. The five sepals are very narrow egg-shaped to triangular, 5.5–6 mm (0.22–0.24 in) long and 1.5 mm (0.059 in) wide. The five petals are white, 7.5–10 mm (0.30–0.39 in) long and 2.5–3 mm (0.098–0.118 in) wide with about twenty-four linear lobes at the tip. There are between twenty-five and thirty stamens. Flowering occurs from January to March and the fruit is a pale blue, oval drupe 10–13 mm (0.39–0.51 in) long, maturing from October to January and containing a hard, sculptured stone.

== Taxonomy ==
Elaeocarpus kirtonii was first formally described in 1886 by Frederick Manson Bailey in A Synopsis of the Queensland Flora, from an unpublished description by Ferdinand von Mueller. The specific epithet (kirtonii) honours W. Kirton, who collected samples of the tree at Bulli in 1885 for Ferdinand von Mueller.

== Distribution and habitat ==
Silver quandong grows from near Milton (35° S) in New South Wales to Eungella National Park (20° S) in tropical Queensland. It grows in tropical, sub-tropical and warm temperate rainforests but is often also seen in cooler and moister sites on volcanic soils and on the richer alluvial soils.

== Ecology ==
The fruit of E. kirtonii is eaten by a large variety of rainforest birds.

== Conservation status ==
This quandong is listed as of "least concern" under the Queensland Government Nature Conservation Act 1992.
