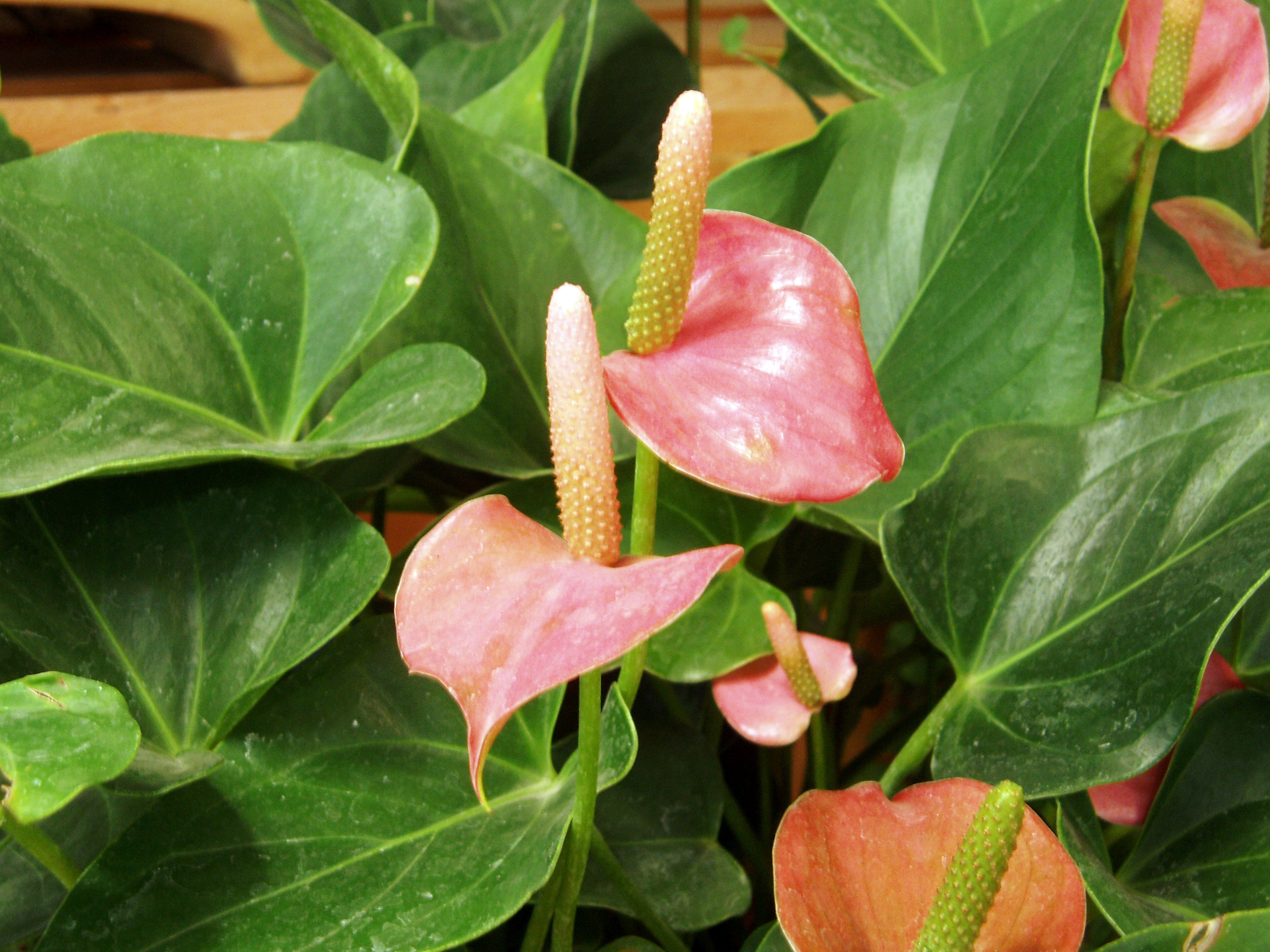
- Anthurium andraeanum cultivar

Scientific classification
- Kingdom: Plantae
- Clade: Tracheophytes
- Clade: Angiosperms
- Clade: Monocots
- Order: Alismatales
- Family: Araceae
- Subfamily: Pothoideae; Engl.

= Pothoideae =

Subfamily of flowering plants

Pothoideae is a subfamily of flowering plants in the family Araceae. These plants are commonly called the true aroids.

== Tribes and genera ==
The subfamily consists of two tribes:

=== Anthurieae ===
1. Anthurium Schott

=== Pothoeae ===
1. Pothos L.
2. Pothoidium Schott (monotypic)
