= Dendrocnide urentissima =

Conservation status
- Least Concern (IUCN 3.1)

Scientific classification
- Kingdom: Plantae
- Clade: Tracheophytes
- Clade: Angiosperms
- Clade: Eudicots
- Clade: Rosids
- Order: Rosales
- Family: Urticaceae
- Genus: Dendrocnide
- Species: D. urentissima

Binomial name
- Dendrocnide urentissima (Gagnep.) Chew

Synonyms
- Dendrocnide chingiana (Hand.-Mazz.) Chew; Laportea chingiana Hand.-Mazz.; Laportea urentissima Gagnep.

Species of flowering plant

Dendrocnide urentissima is a species of flowering plant in the family Urticaceae. It is found in southern China (southwestern Guangxi and southern Yunnan), Vietnam, and Cambodia. It is a fast-growing shrub or small tree, up to 15 metres tall, with stinging hairs on its fruits. It grows in tropical and subtropical hill and montane moist monsoon forest and in disturbed areas, typically on limestone-derived soils. It grows from 800 to 1,300 metres elevation in southern China, and as low as 275 metres elevation in Vietnam. It is threatened by habitat loss.

The species was first described as Laportea urentissima by François Gagnepain in 1928. In 1965 Wee-Lek Chew placed the species in genus Dendrocnide as D. urentissima.
