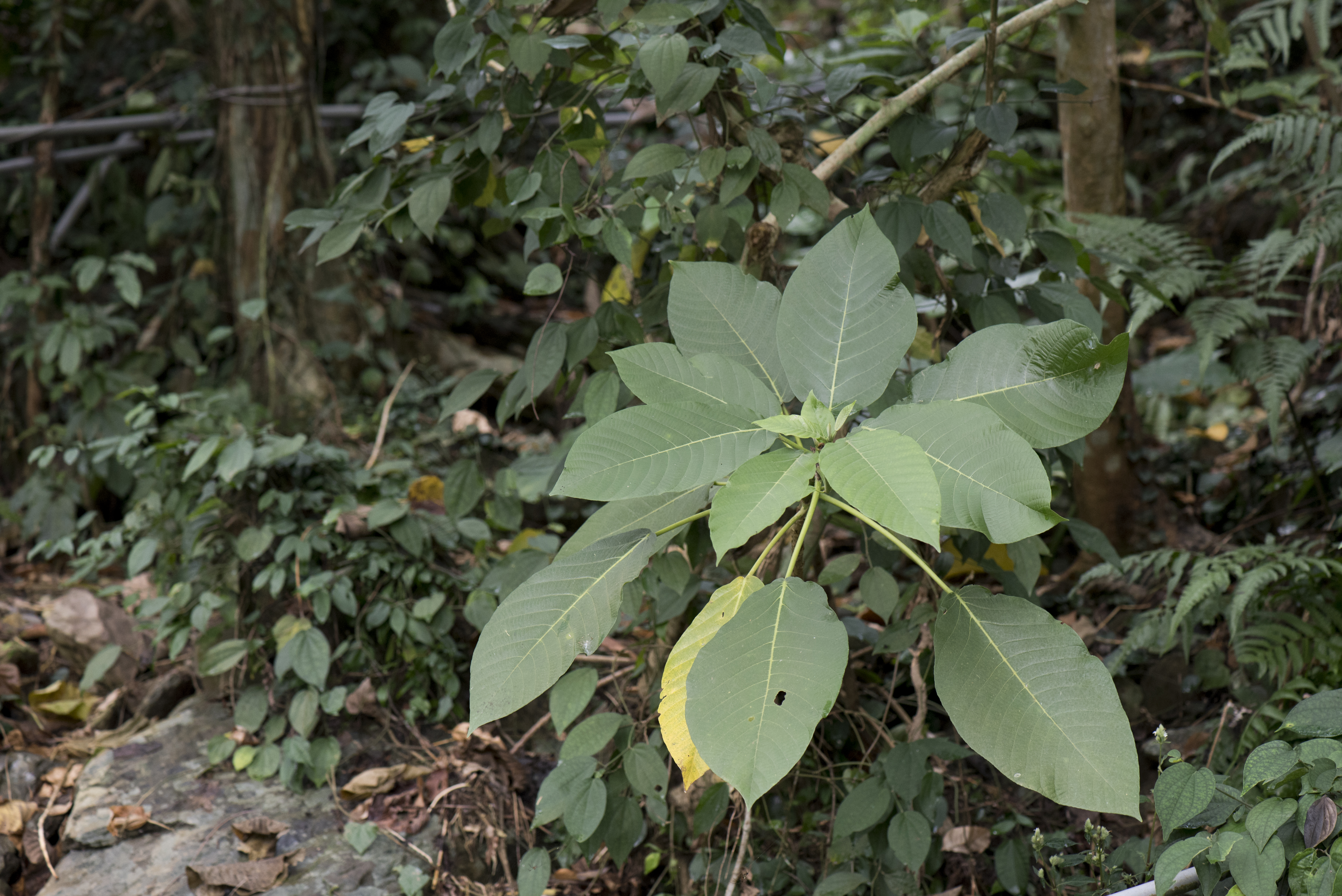

Scientific classification
- Kingdom: Plantae
- Clade: Tracheophytes
- Clade: Angiosperms
- Clade: Eudicots
- Clade: Rosids
- Order: Rosales
- Family: Urticaceae
- Genus: Dendrocnide
- Species: D. meyeniana

Binomial name
- Dendrocnide meyeniana (Walp.) Chew

Synonyms
- List: Urtica umbellata Blanco (1837); Urtica meyeniana Walp. (1843); Urtica ferox Blanco (1845); Laportea gaudichaudiana Wedd. (1856); Laportea pterostigma Wedd. (1869); Laportea meyeniana Warb. (1905); Laportea mindanaensis Warb. (1905); Laportea batanensis C.B.Rob. (1911); Laportea diffusa C.B.Rob. (1911); Laportea leytensis C.B.Rob. (1911); Laportea subglabra Hayata (1911); Laportea platyphylla Merr. (1916)

= Dendrocnide meyeniana =

Species of tree

Dendrocnide meyeniana, the poisonous wood nettle, is a species of tree in the family Urticaceae, native to the thickets and secondary forests of Taiwan and the Philippines. The specific epithet meyeniana honors Franz Meyen, who collected the type specimen in Manila during his world cruise.

In the Philippines, the city of Lipa in Batangas is named after this plant. Locals distinguish it primarily by the short stinging hairs on its twigs.

In Taiwanese Mandarin, it is widely known as yǎoréngǒu ("biting dog"), a name which has been used since the early Qing period referring to the skin irritation or inflammation its stinging hairs may cause. Among the Paiwan people, and Puyuma people of Taiwan, both ethnic groups have the custom of whipping adolescents with the plant as a rite of passage or a corporal punishment.

== Medicinal importance ==
The poisonous wood nettle may cause acute dermatitis when the skin gets into contact with the stinging hairs on its leaves, or other parts such as stems or inflorescences. The fruit and receptacle are edible, but the stalk is not, because it is covered with stinging hairs. The stinging hairs of D. meyeniana are short and hard to see. Although the leaves are densely covered with stinging hairs, they are invisible to the eyes.

In Philippine traditional medicine, the tree's sap is prepared as a drink for improving the production of breast milk. Its roots and leaves can also be used as a diuretic.

== Gallery ==
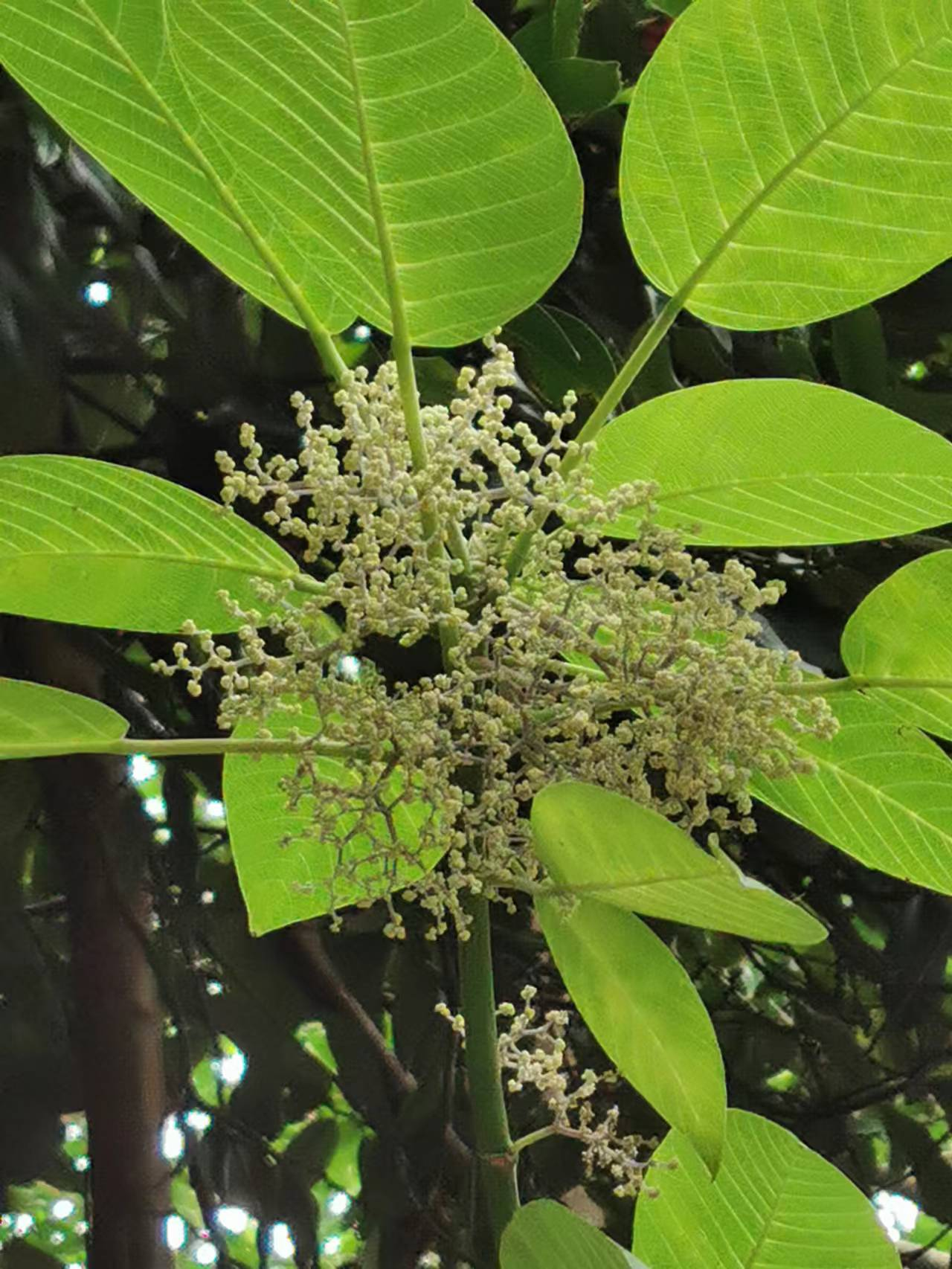
Axillary inflorescences. Dioecious.

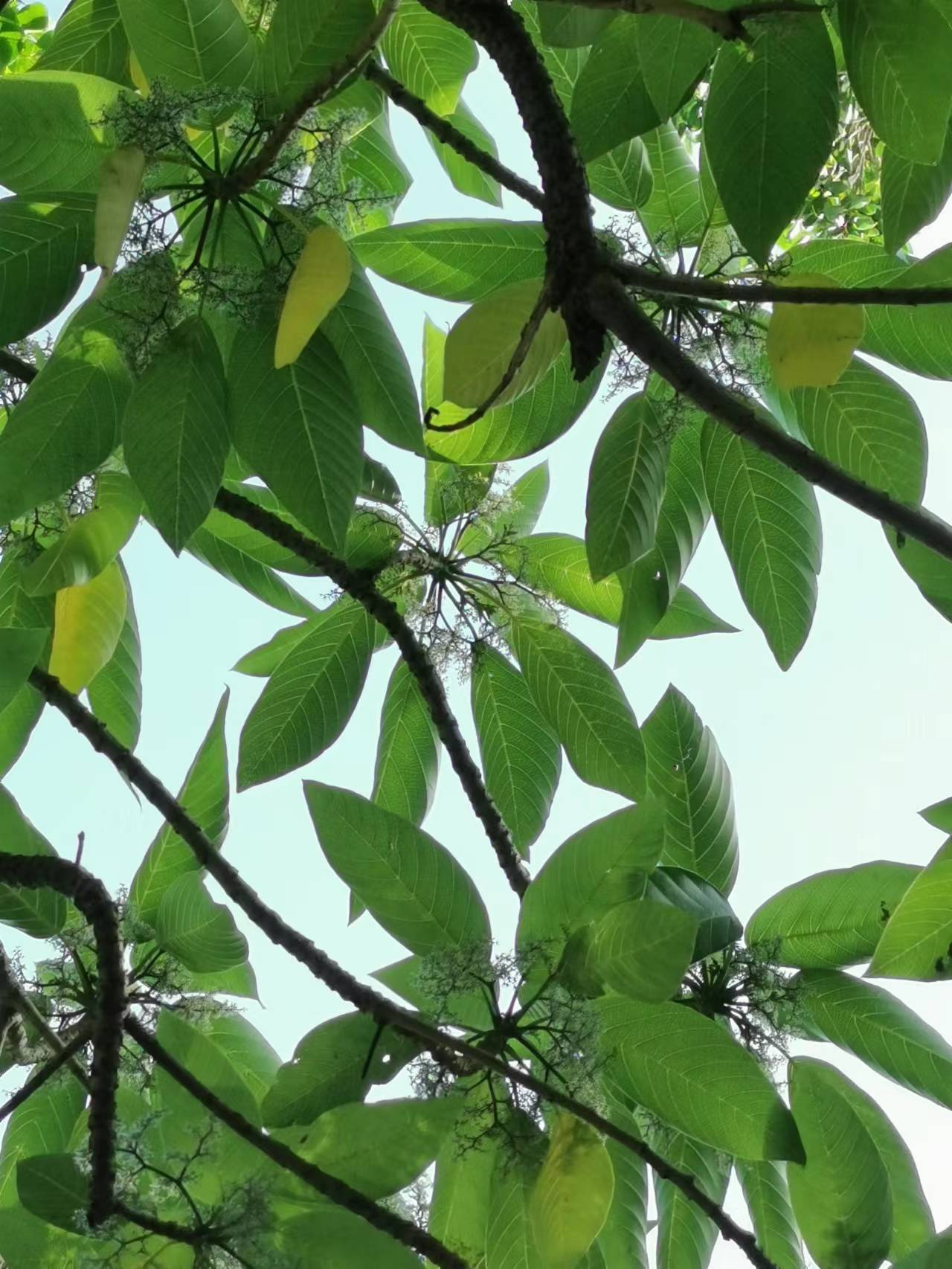
Leaves alternate, clustered at the ends of the branches.

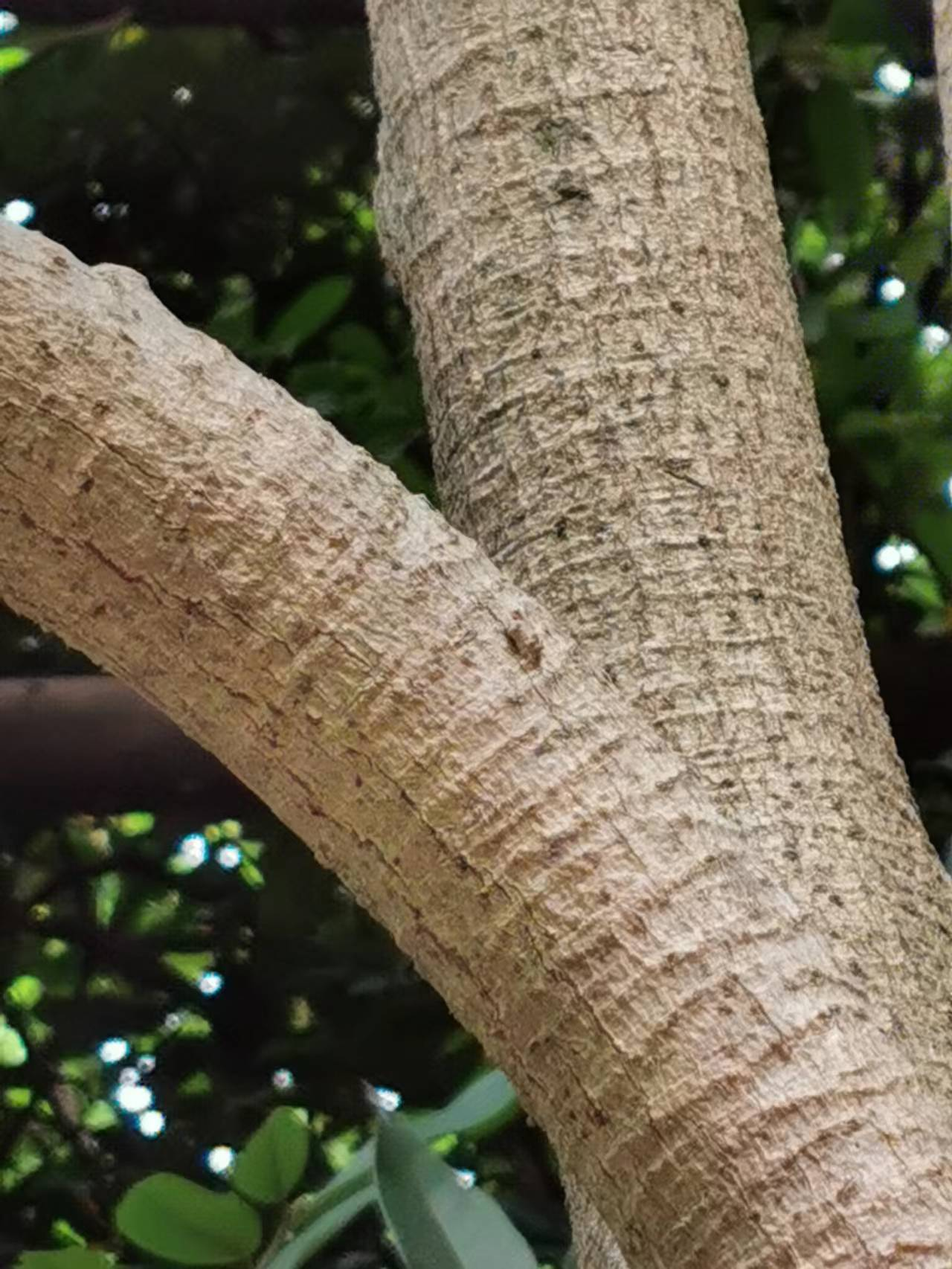
Obvious lenticels

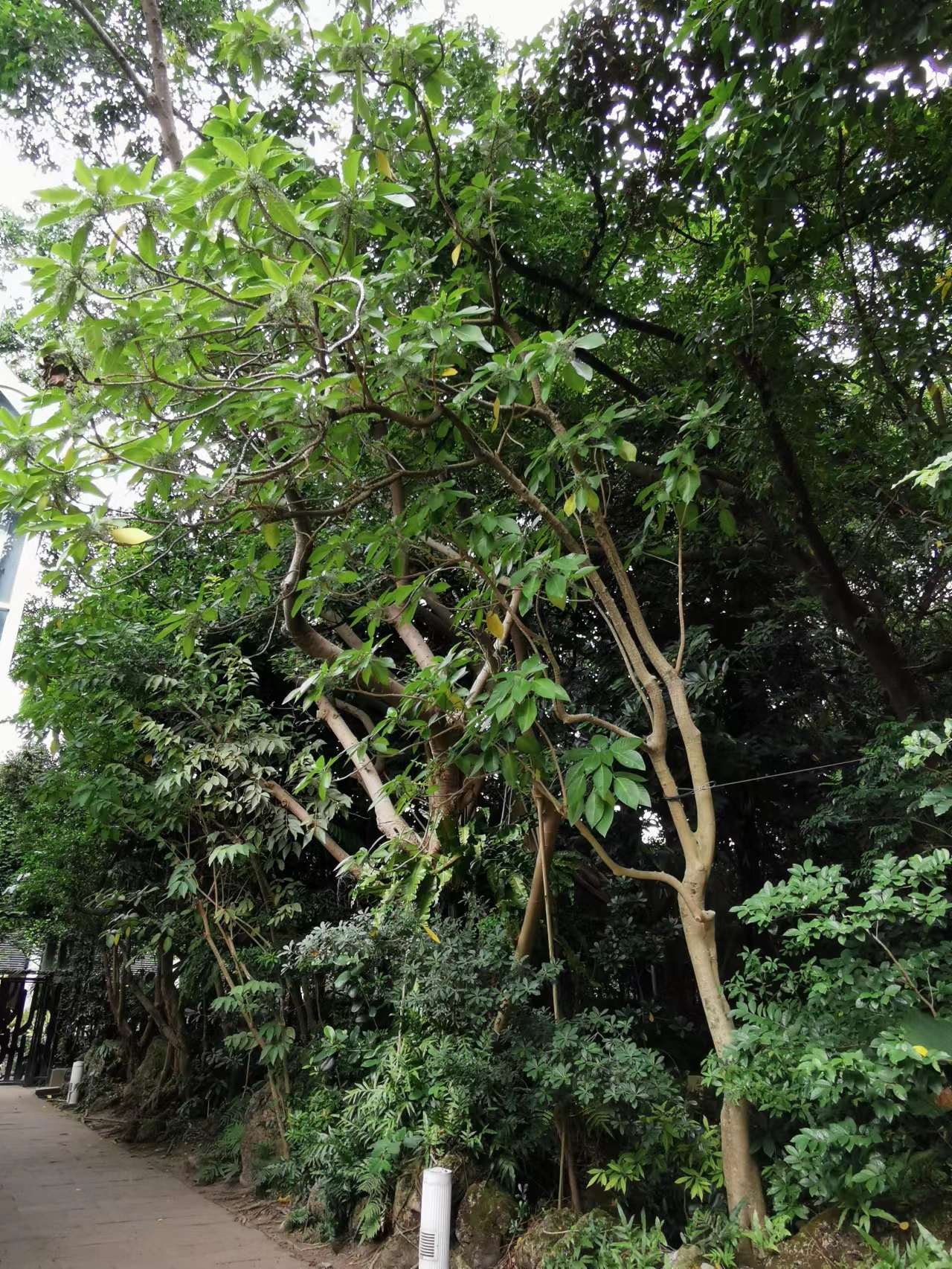
Trunk light brown, straight.
