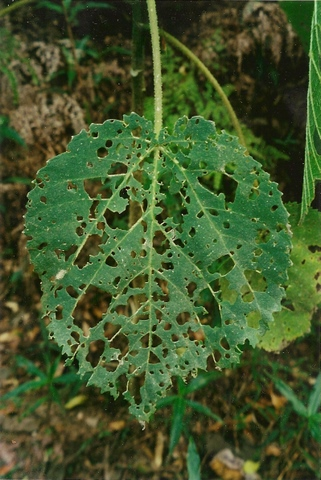
- Chewed leaf at Gumbaynggirr State Conservation Area, NSW

Scientific classification
- Kingdom: Plantae
- Clade: Tracheophytes
- Clade: Angiosperms
- Clade: Eudicots
- Clade: Rosids
- Order: Rosales
- Family: Urticaceae
- Genus: Dendrocnide
- Species: D. excelsa

Binomial name
- Dendrocnide excelsa (Wedd.) Chew

= Dendrocnide excelsa =

Species of plant in the nettle family

Dendrocnide excelsa, commonly known as the giant stinging tree or fibrewood, is a rainforest tree in the nettle family Urticaceae, which is endemic to eastern Australia. It occurs from Tathra, New South Wales to Imbil in southeastern Queensland, and is very common at Dorrigo National Park and other rainforest walks in eastern Australia. The habitat of the giant stinging tree is subtropical, warm temperate or littoral rainforest, particularly in disturbed areas, previously flattened by storms or cyclones. It is well known for its extremely painful, long-lasting sting.

== Description ==
Dendrocnide excelsa is a medium to large-sized tree with a buttressed base, sometimes over 40 metres tall and in excess of 6 metres wide at the base. The DBH is up to 4.3 m (14.1 ft).

The trunk can be fluted or flanged. The outer bark is grey and smooth, with minor corky markings. The trunk and buttresses are shaped in even curves. The leaves are alternate and toothed, heart-shaped and very large in positions of shade, exceeding 30 cm in length and a similar width. The sun leaves are smaller. The leaves, which are covered in stinging hairs, are eaten by various insects such as the chrysomelid beetle, and mammals.

Flowers appear from November to April, forming in short panicles. The fruit is a purple or blackish nut, maturing from March to August. The flesh is edible, but the danger of stinging hairs precludes human consumption. The fruit is eaten by many rainforest birds, including the regent bowerbird and the green catbird.

== Sting ==
All aerial parts of the tree have stinging hairs, and can cause a severe reaction on contact with skin, so it is a hazard to livestock, travelers and campers. However, the tree is an important member of the ecosystems of eastern Australian forests. The sting is considered more severe than Dendrocnide photiniphylla (shining-leaved stinging tree), but not as severe as Dendrocnide moroides (gympie stinger). The tree delivers neurotoxin proteins which researchers named gympietides, similar to toxins found in spiders and cone snails, and not previously seen in plants. It was postulated that the long-term pain from the gympietides may be due to permanent changes in the sodium channels in sensory neurons.

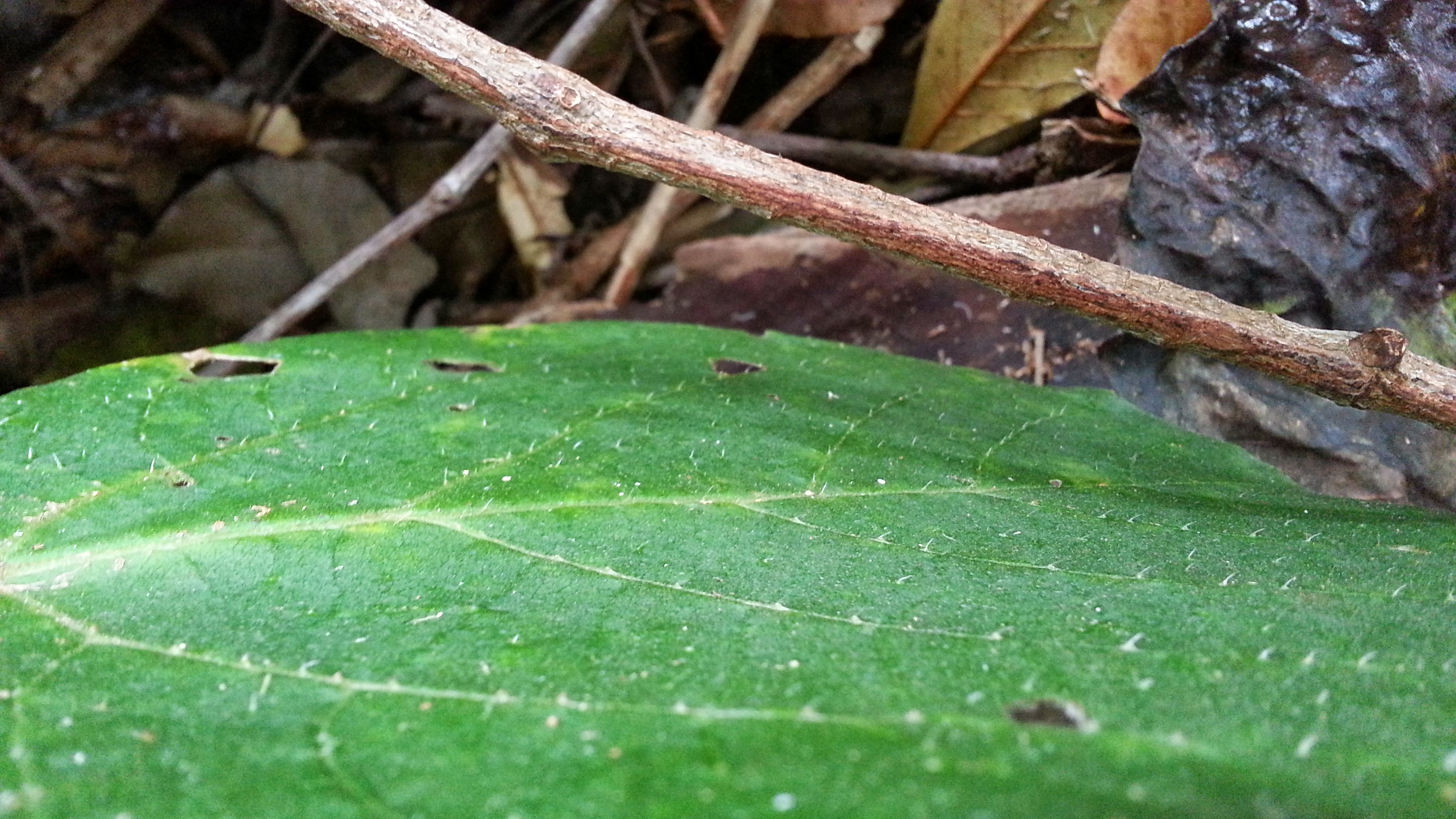
Leaf surface of giant stinging tree showing the stinging hairs.

The venom binds to and fires pain receptors in the nervous system; there are hopes that understanding how these proteins work could lead to the creation of new painkillers.

Minor stings can last for an hour or two. However, severe stinging can last for months. First aid for the sting is to apply wax hair-removal strips and then yank them off to remove the trees' hairs. Dendrocnide stings have been known to kill dogs and horses that have brushed against them.

It was found that even heavy welding gloves did not protect researchers from stings while studying the tree.

== Uses ==
Indigenous Australians used the fibres to make nets and lines.

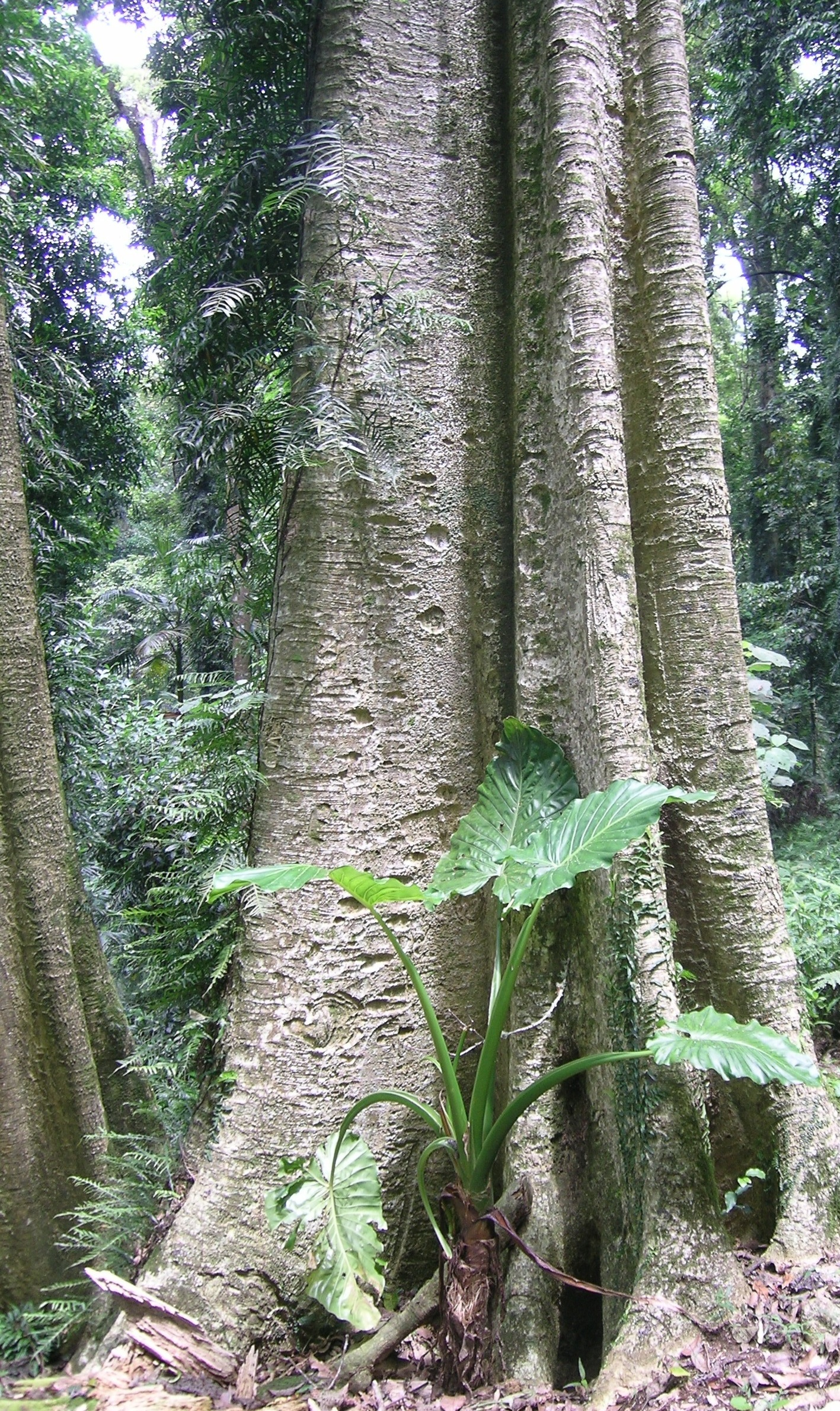
Alocasia brisbanensis growing beneath a giant stinging tree at Dorrigo National Park, NSW
