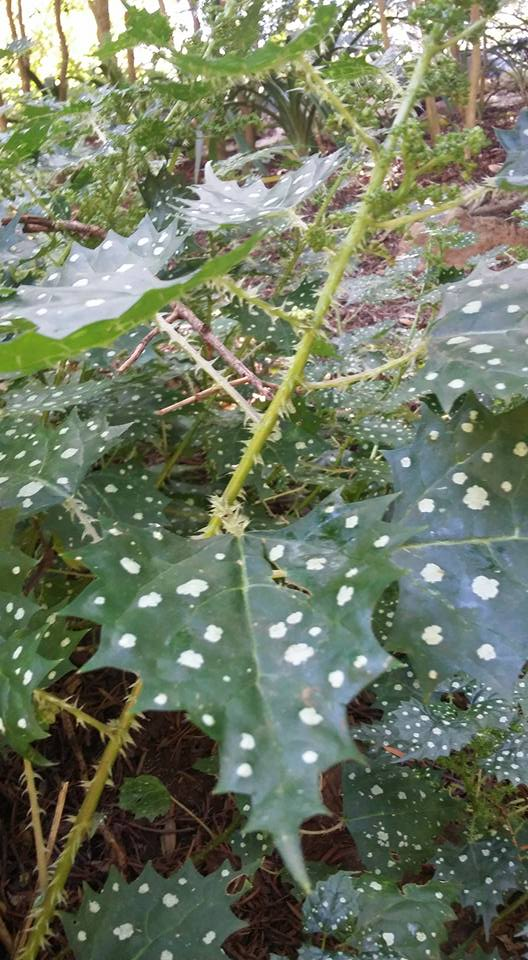

Scientific classification
- Kingdom: Plantae
- Clade: Tracheophytes
- Clade: Angiosperms
- Clade: Eudicots
- Clade: Rosids
- Order: Rosales
- Family: Urticaceae
- Genus: Laportea
- Species: L. grossa

Binomial name
- Laportea grossa (Wedd.) Chew

Synonyms
- Fleurya grossa Wedd.; Urtica grossa E.Mey.

= Laportea grossa =

Species of flowering plant

Laportea grossa, or spotted nettle, is an African plant in the family Urticaceae, and one of 31 species in the genus. This species occurs in shady places in coastal and escarpment forests, closed woodland and on streambanks from George through the Eastern Cape, KwaZulu-Natal to southern Mozambique. Young leaves of this species are cooked and eaten as a vegetable.

It has decorative leaves marked by conspicuous white spots and is covered in stinging hairs. It is a sprawling, herbaceous perennial or annual, growing to about 1 m tall. Its soft, erect stems armed with stinging hairs have a tendency to root at the nodes, and are therefore readily propagated from cuttings. Leaves are alternate, triangular, coarsely toothed, and also covered in stinging hairs. The white spots on the leaves are not always present, but when there a stinging hair is found at the centre of each white spot - the lower leaf surface and petiole are well-covered. The stinging hairs are carried on slender protuberances, and can inflict a painful, burning sting that may cause localised redness of the skin.

Laportea grossa is monoecious, having male and female flowers on the same plant. Small greenish flowers grow in panicles in the leaf axils. Male flowers are some 2 mm in diameter, regular in shape, with 4-5 tepals and 5 stamens. Female flowers are 1.5 mm long, with 4 tepals of unequal size, and a white style protruding. They produce a small, dry seed, ± 1.7 mm long.

Fruits, flowers and leaves of this species are eaten by the Green Twinspot, Grey waxbill and Common waxbill.

The genus was named after the French naturalist François Louis de la Porte, comte de Castelnau.

== Gallery ==
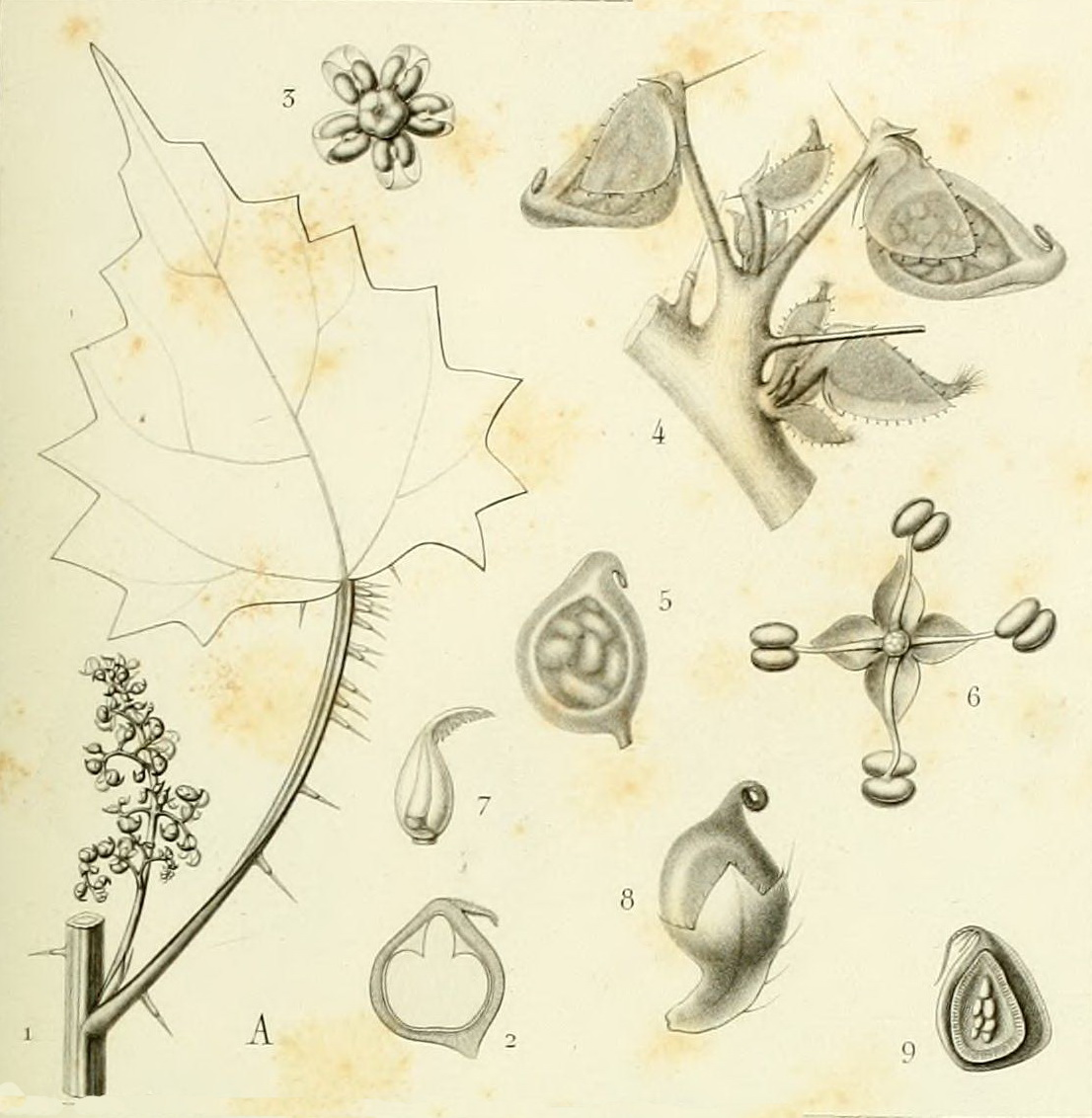
Illustration by Hugh Algernon Weddell
