= Dendrocnide corallodesme =

Scientific classification
- Kingdom: Plantae
- Clade: Embryophytes
- Clade: Tracheophytes
- Clade: Spermatophytes
- Clade: Angiosperms
- Clade: Eudicots
- Clade: Rosids
- Order: Rosales
- Family: Urticaceae
- Genus: Dendrocnide
- Species: D. corallodesme

Binomial name
- Dendrocnide corallodesme (Lauterb.) Chew

Synonyms
- Laportea corallodesme Lauterb.

Species of plant in the nettle family

Dendrocnide corallodesme, the mango-leafed stinger, is a species of flowering plant in the nettle family Urticaceae, native to New Guinea and Queensland in Australia. It is a rainforest tree reaching 6 m (20 ft), with irritating hairs on its flowers and abaxial leaf midribs.
