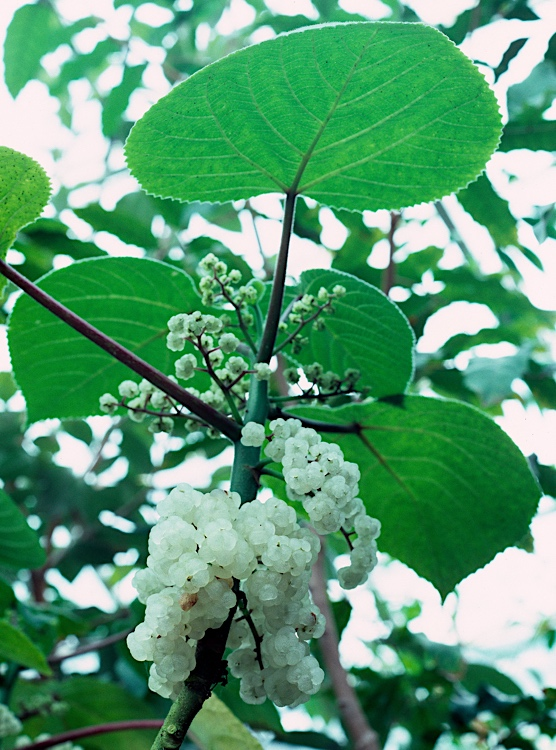

Scientific classification
- Kingdom: Plantae
- Clade: Embryophytes
- Clade: Tracheophytes
- Clade: Spermatophytes
- Clade: Angiosperms
- Clade: Eudicots
- Clade: Rosids
- Order: Rosales
- Family: Urticaceae
- Genus: Dendrocnide
- Species: D. cordata

Binomial name
- Dendrocnide cordata (Warb. ex H.J.P.Winkl.) Chew

Synonyms
- Laportea cordata Warb. ex H.J.P.Winkl.

= Dendrocnide cordata =

Species of plant in the nettle family

Dendrocnide cordata, the stinger, is a species of flowering plant in the nettle family Urticaceae, native to the Bismarck Archipelago, the Lesser Sunda Islands and New Guinea. It is a rainforest tree reaching 10 m (33 ft), with irritating hairs on its large leaves.

The name has been misapplied in the past to some occurrences of D. moroides and D. cordifolia in Queensland.
