= Childbirth in Trinidad and Tobago =

Trinidad and Tobago is the southernmost country of the West Indies; as of 2013, its adjusted maternal mortality rate is 84 deaths per 100 000 women; the rate is adjusted for underreporting and misclassification by the World Health Organization. The contraceptive rate, that is the percentage of women in union aged 15–49 years currently using contraception, is 42.5%. The fertility rate is 1.8 children per woman. Fourteen weeks of maternity leave with allowances is provided by the government; women typically choose to take this leave after the birth rather than before, to spend time with the newborn.

== Pre-natal care ==
95.7% of pregnant women have at least 1 prenatal care visit. These visits most commonly occur at the woman's local clinic. Diabetes and high blood pressure are two of the more serious conditions for pregnant women in Trinidad and Tobago. Often, if women do not have an antenatal visit early enough in their pregnancy, these conditions can be missed, leading to complications during birth. The biggest challenge for prenatal health is maintaining a healthy diet. Caribbean cuisine is mostly highly seasoned, with a high salt content, and, along with the common practice of frying and high saturated fat, this contributes to poor management of diabetes and increased risk of high blood pressure.

For treatment of their diabetes and high blood pressure, during pregnancy or otherwise, Trinidadians and Tobagonians often view traditional Caribbean medicine as complementary to prescribed medicines. For example, one study found the following plants used among half of Caribbean respondents for diabetes: cerasse/noni/caraili/bitter melon (Momordica charantia), cinnamon bark and pills (Cinnamomum verum), mauby bark (Colubrina arborescens), aloe (Aloe vera, Aloe barbadensis), bush tea (unspecified medicinal plants) and celery (Apium graveolens). Cucumber (Cucumis sativus), garlic (Allium sativum), and tamarind leaf (Tamarindus indica) were also used to control high blood pressure. These plants were crushed, liquefied, and consumed cold or steeped as a brewed tea. Momordica charantia was the most popular botanical that participants used to treat type 2 diabetes.

== Traditional medicine ==
Traditional medicine is also used for childbirth and infertility. One study, which conducted interviews with Trinidadians over a four-year period from 1996 to 2000, found the use of the following plants for childbirth and infertility: Mimosa pudica, Ruta graveolens, Abelmoschus moschatus, Chamaesyce hirta, Cola nitida, Ambrosia cumanenesis, Pilea microphylla, Eryngium foetidum, Aristolochia rugosa, Aristolochia trilobata, Coleus aromaticus, Laportea aestuans and Vetiveria zizanioides.

== Intercourse ==
The adolescent fertility rate in Trinidad and Tobago, as of 2013, is 35.5 births per 1000 women aged 15–19 years. In 2007, a representative sample of all 13- to 15-year-old students in Trinidad and Tobago was surveyed about sexual health: 26.0% of students had sexual intercourse during their life and 13.2% of students had sexual intercourse for the first time before age 13. Male students were significantly more likely than female students to have sexual intercourse (32.0% of all males versus 20.2% of all females) and also to have it for the first time before age 13 (19.9% of all males versus 6.3% of all females). In total, 17.6% of students had sexual intercourse with two or more partners during their life. Male students (23.9%) were significantly more likely than female students (11.4%) to have had multiple partners. Among students who had sexual intercourse during the past 12 months, 59.1% used a condom the last time they had sexual intercourse, but only 22.4% used a condom most of the time or always during the past 12 months.

Even though the above survey shows an early age of initiation of sexual activity and low utilization of contraceptive practices, a 2008 study of the twin island country showed both a decline in adolescent fertility rates as well as adolescent births over the past decade.

== Abortion ==
In Trinidad and Tobago the abortion rate is the same as the birth rate; that is there is approximately the same number of abortions per year as births, around 19,000. However, in Trinidad and Tobago, abortion is illegal in cases of incest, rape, social and economic reasons and only legal when the mother's life is in danger. Annually between 3000 and 4000 women are treated in the public hospitals for the consequences of unsafe terminations; it is the leading cause of maternal morbidity. Abortion is not openly discussed in Trinidad and Tobago. There is an impression that Trinidadians are greatly opposed to abortion reform law, due in part to certain vocal religious groups; however, a careful survey of 918 citizens conducted in 2005 found that even though almost half of the participants had an unfavorable perception of abortion, more than half of them were in favor of broadening the legal grounds for accessing terminations.

== HIV ==
As for the prevalence rates for sexually transmitted infections: 1.7% of adults aged 15–49 in Trinidad and Tobago have human immunodeficiency virus (HIV) as of 2013.

== Labour and birth ==
From the most recent study in 2012, 100% of births in Trinidad and Tobago are attended by a health professional. 97.4% of total births take place in an institution. Of total births in Trinidad and Tobago, approximately 2% occur in the home, 83% in public hospitals, 14.7% in private hospitals, and 0.0025% at the Mamatoto Birth Centre. Except for in the case of home births, once labour begins, mothers generally proceed to the hospitals or birth centre as directed by health personnel, usually by telephone.

In the public hospitals, as the standard of care, midwives attend the delivery of babies. Only in the case of a complicated birth, for example one requiring Cesarean section or suturing, will the obstetrician on staff be called. Cesarean sections are not available on request and the rate in most public hospitals vary from 10 to 14%, with higher rates occurring in hospitals that receive more referrals. There tends to be a high rate of episiotomies in the public hospitals, as high as 50%. There is limited availability of epidurals in these hospitals and for the most part, natural childbirth takes place. Continuous fetal monitoring technology is not used.

== Birthing practices ==
=== Public hospitals ===
The public hospitals tend to adhere to several outdated Western medical policies which are not based on current research or empirical evidence according to the Cochrane Library (a database of systematic reviews); for example, labouring women are kept lying down in bed and are not allowed to have a support person, or eat solid foods, and delivery occurs with the women's legs in stirrups. Even when new policy is made, it is not necessarily practised, as is the case with Mount Hope Medical facility which does have more modern policy to align with the baby-friendly status, but it is not followed well. In all public facilities, labouring women share the same space for the most part, in an open, non air-conditioned floor, with only screens separating them for privacy. Women are moved into a separate room for the delivery. One direct relative may be allowed for the delivery but this person oftentimes has to meet a series of requirements specific to the hospital and can still be denied on the whim of the staff. For example, the San Fernando General Hospital (serving the southern end of the island) permits no relatives in the delivery room; the Sangre Grande Hospital (serving the east end) has a form with rules that must be signed and followed by the partner; and the Port of Spain General Hospital (serving the west end) requires proof of birth classes along with other requirements. Doulas (trained emotional support persons) are not allowed to provide labour support. If the doula is a direct relative, she may accompany the mother for the delivery as the one allowed family member.

=== Private hospitals ===
In the private hospitals, babies are delivered solely by obstetricians, and the expectant mothers are attended by nurses, midwives (who essentially act as labour and delivery nurses) and doulas, if specifically hired by the mothers. The total cost to have a vaginal delivery in the private sector is approximately $17,000-20,000 TTD (about US$3000) and double that price for a Cesarean section. Certain employers do provide private insurance, but it does not cover a significant portion of this cost to make it an affordable option for most. The private hospitals have similar technology use, as in hospitals in the U.S., for fetal monitoring and pain management. Unlike the public hospitals, epidurals are guaranteed if wanted. Cesarean sections are performed in cases of medical indication and can also be performed on request, though that is rare. The Cesarean section rate in most private facilities is about 30%. Labouring women in private facilities often have more flexibility in what they can do: whether it is eating during labour, moving around, or having numerous support persons with them. In general, labour takes place in a private air conditioned room with family members and a doula if previously arranged by the family.

=== Home births ===
Planned births occurring in the home are attended by midwives. To qualify for a home birth, the midwife must approve the birth as low risk with no up front medical indication for need of services unavailable in the home context. As part of the training of midwives in Trinidad and Tobago, all midwifery students must attend at least three home births before their certification is considered complete.

=== Mamatoto Birth Centre ===
At the Birth Centre, Mamatoto, the deliveries of babies are attended by midwives following the midwifery model of care. Mothers can labour in whatever position they feel most comfortable, and water, massages, acupressure and doulas are available at every birth for pain management. Over 90% of births are natural vaginal deliveries, requiring no interventions. The center has about a 2% episiotomy rate and limited use of birth technology, though they are adequately prepared for emergencies, with an ambulance paid on retainer to transport mothers to the hospital if need be. Obstetricians and pediatricians are members of the Birth Centre's board and while they are not usually present for births, they offer advice when required. The Centre attends about 50-70 births annually. Births at Mamatoto cost about $14,000 TTD but there are reduced costs, based on family income, and pro bono services for unemployed or teenage women.

=== Maternal choice ===
In general, if a mother has the means, she will choose to deliver her baby in a private facility instead of a public one. In part, this is due to the poor reputation the public hospitals get because of the media's scandalizing portrayals of maternal deaths. Some mothers might even take out loans, "baby loans," so that they can deliver at private facilities instead of the public ones.

== Postpartum and newborn care ==
The afterbirth or placenta in hospitals is discarded as biological waste and there is no particular country-wide ritual observed with it. Newborns, for the most part, remain at the mother's side after being examined by health professionals. Public hospitals do a better job of preventing the separation of Mother-baby in the hours directly after birth, in part because they have no regular nursery facilities as private hospitals do.

Women typically stay in the hospital, public or private, for no more than 24 hours after birth. The tendency is towards early discharge due to overcrowding in the public facilities, and due to financial charges in the private facilities. Most hospitals have policy encouraging the initiation of breastfeeding before discharge. However, the early initiation of breastfeeding rate in Trinidad and Tobago is only 41.2% as of 2013; that is the percentage of infants who receive milk from their mother's breast within an hour of being born. Furthermore, as of 2013, only 12.8% of newborns are exclusively breastfed in the first six months after birth and 83.4% are introduced to solid or semi solid or soft foods in their first six to eight months. In part, this phenomenon might be due to the often-spoken-of belief in Trinidad and Tobago that in order for the baby to sleep properly at night, he/she must be given cereal with his/her milk before bed.

The under five mortality rate in Trinidad and Tobago is 21 deaths per 1000 live births and the infant mortality is 19 deaths per 1000 live births. The leading cause of death is prematurity. There are only three Neonatal Intensive Care Units (NICU) in the country; all three are in separate public health facilities in Trinidad: in Port of Spain, San Fernando and Mount Hope. If there is suspicion that a baby will be born premature, the expectant mother will be referred to one of these hospitals for the delivery. Private facilities have no Neonatal Intensive Care Units (NICU). If a newborn is admitted to the NICU, mothers have to adhere to hospital policy which does not allow them to stay overnight with the baby, and requires the pumping of breast milk for the infant.

Postpartum depression is not carefully monitored or measured in the country. As part of the public health facilities, there is a six-week postpartum checkup, during which time this condition can perhaps be detected, but there is little follow up with the mother between discharge and this checkup. Although, if the mother chooses, she can visit a physician in her local health clinic at any time. In the private health facilities, mothers are assigned a specific pediatrician who examines the newborn at birth; this personal physician can be contacted by the mother if she chooses to do so, in regards to postpartum depression. At Mamatoto, discharge typically occurs four hours following birth, after which the health staff call the mother every single day for a week, and then once a week until the six-week postpartum visit. In this way, there is ample follow up to give health personnel the opportunity to ensure the mother's mental health.

=== At-home care ===
Once mother and baby are back at home, nuclear and extended family and many community members become involved with the care of the newborn and mother. It is typical for a new mother to either stay with a female relative for a few weeks directly after discharge, or for a female relative to move in with the new mother for a few weeks to help with cooking, cleaning and caring for both mother and baby. Often time, senior females in the family and community are most vocal with their opinions for care, and their advice is generally regarded with respect, though not always enacted. Their advice might take the form of more traditional medicine and folklore. The following are examples of some beliefs: the mole (soft part of the skull) of the baby should be covered with a hat especially during the night, dew fall or rainfall, to prevent the baby from getting sick; coconut oil should be used to massage and stretch the limbs of the newborn; certain amulets and jewelry should be placed on newborn to ward off the "evil eye"; small amounts of breast milk may be placed in newborn's eye to prevent infection; and soursop might be given to promote sleepiness of the newborn. As for the mother, a drink of mauby bark (Colubrina arborescens) should be consumed to "cleanse" the body; tea of vervine should be consumed to promote breastfeeding; and thick sheets may be wrapped around the mother's stomach for weeks to help it revert to its original size. Some health professionals have also noted that an enema is proposed to mothers frequently by family and community members for a variety of reasons.

Lastly, newborns might go through particular rites of passages according to the religion of their family. For instance, most babies born into Christian homes have Christenings.
