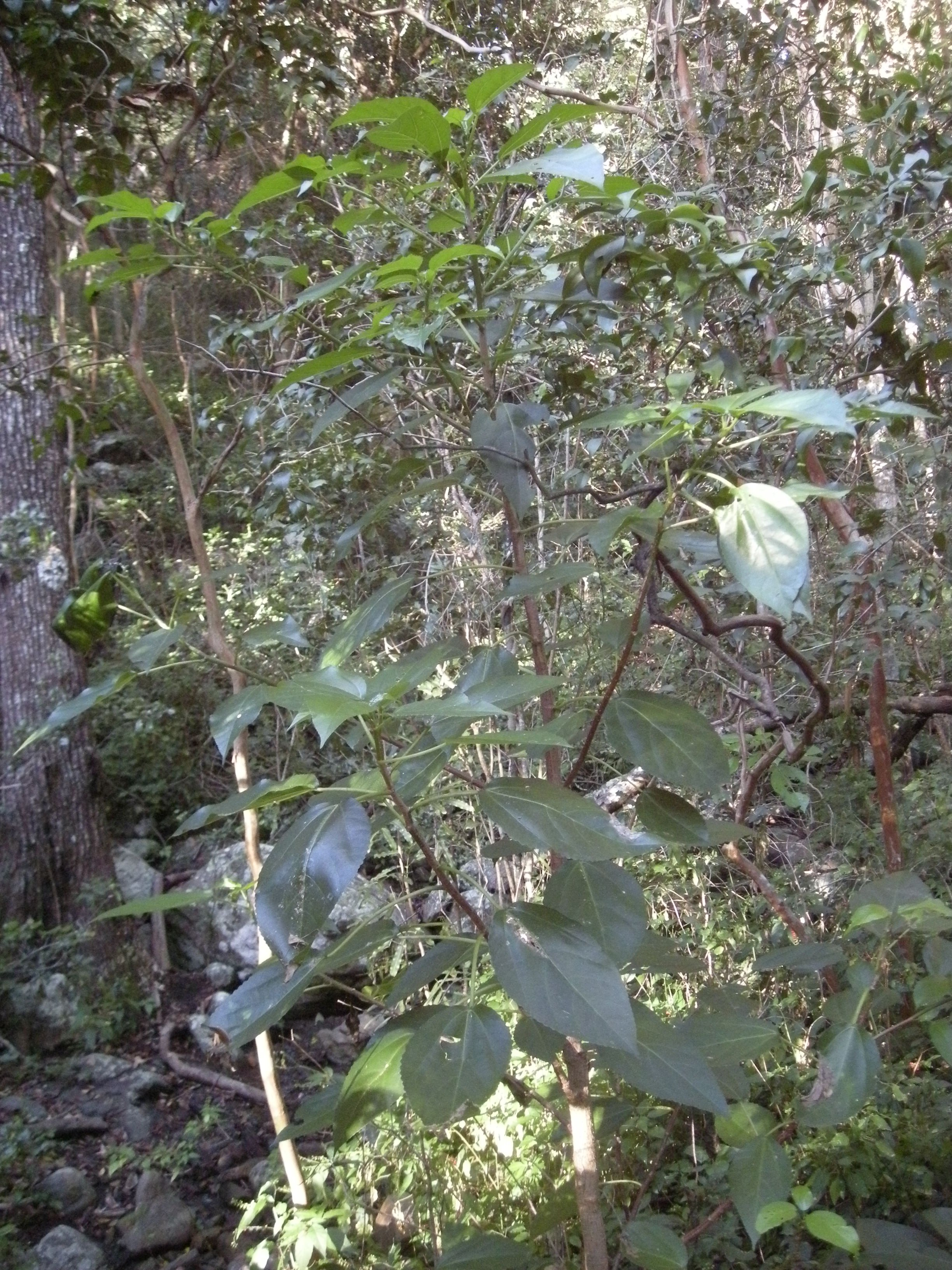

Conservation status
- Least Concern (NCA)
- Least Concern (IUCN 3.1)

Scientific classification
- Kingdom: Plantae
- Clade: Tracheophytes
- Clade: Angiosperms
- Clade: Eudicots
- Clade: Rosids
- Order: Rosales
- Family: Urticaceae
- Genus: Dendrocnide
- Species: D. photiniphylla

Binomial name
- Dendrocnide photiniphylla (Kunth) Chew

Synonyms
- Fleurya photiniphylla Kunth; Laportea photiniphylla (Kunth) Wedd.; Urticastrum photiniphylla (Kunth) Kuntze; Urera leichardiana Wedd.; Urtica photiniphylla A.Cunn. ex Wedd.

= Dendrocnide photiniphylla =

Shining-leaved stinging tree

Species of tree native to Australia

Dendrocnide photiniphylla, the shining-leaved stinging tree, is a rainforest tree of eastern Australia. It occurs from near the Colo River northwest of Sydney to Cooktown in tropical Queensland. A versatile species, it occurs in many different rainforest types. The specific epithet photiniphylla translates to 'shining leaf'. The generic name Dendrocnide translates to 'stinging tree'.

== Common names ==
This species is known by many common names, including fibrewood, small-leaved nettle, mulberry-leaved stinging tree, and gympie.

== Sting ==
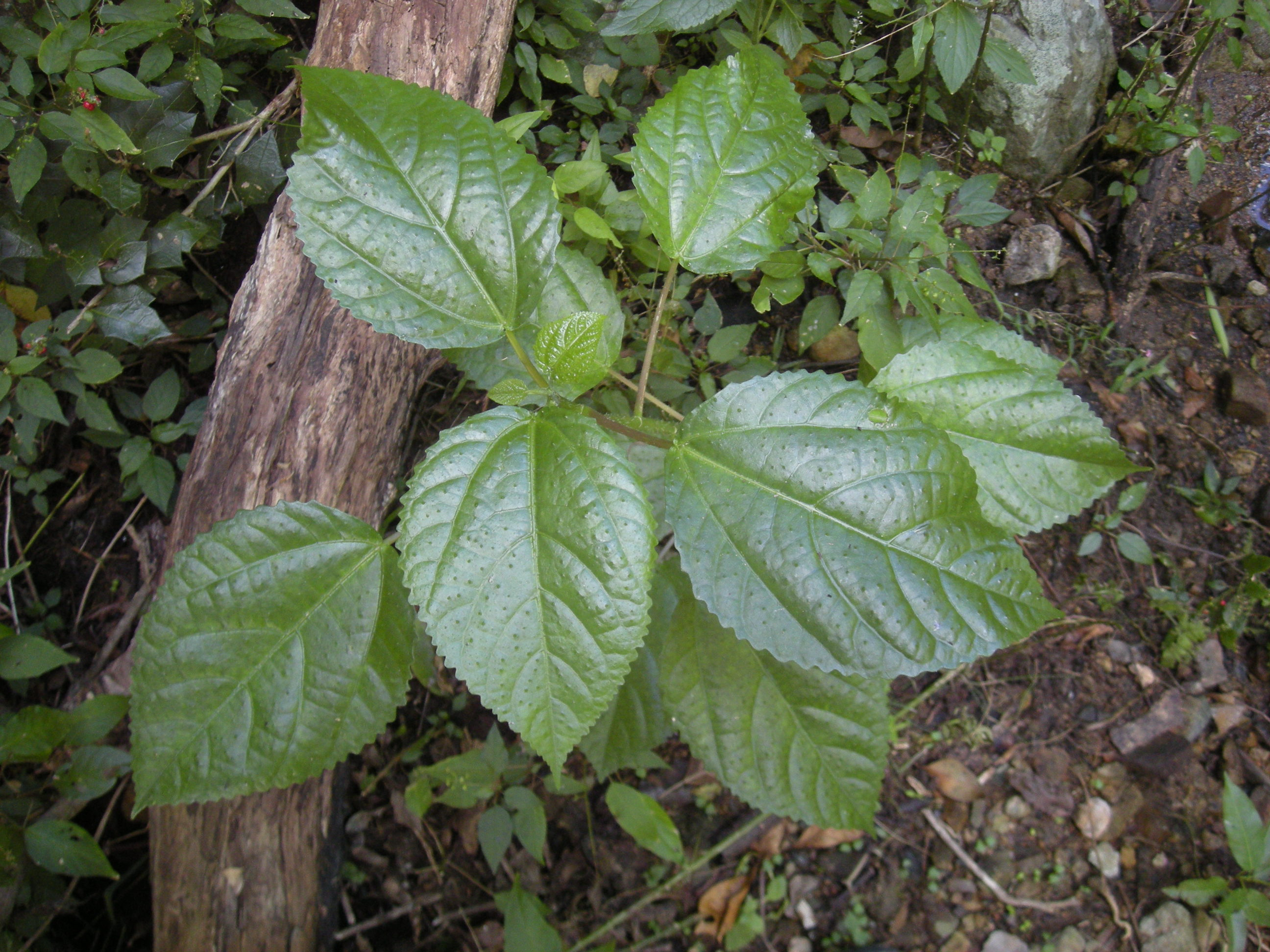
D. photinophylla seedling with pronounced stinging hairs on the upper surface of the leaf

Stinging trees are often disliked by bushwalkers and nature lovers because of the reaction of human skin to their stinging hairs. However, they are an important member of the ecosystems of Australian rainforests. The sting of this plant is not considered as severe as the related Dendrocnide excelsa or Dendrocnide moroides. However, avoiding the leaves and twigs is strongly recommended.

== Description ==
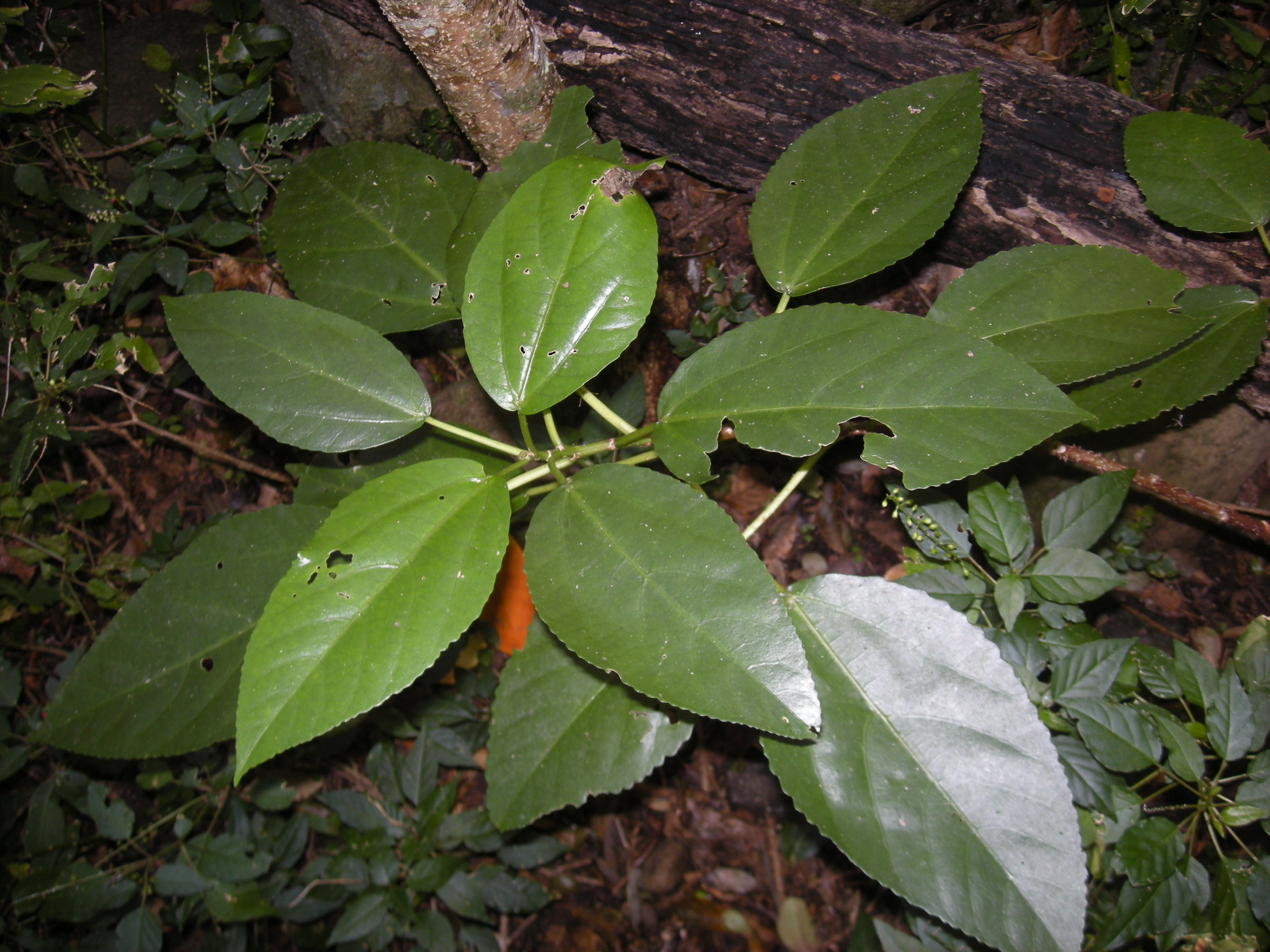
Older D. photiniphylla with mature-form glossy leaves having stinging hairs restricted primarily to the leaf veins

A medium to large-sized tree up to 30 m (98 ft) tall, its stem diameter is up to 75 cm (30 in). The trunk is flanged or buttressed. The grey bark is fairly smooth, but with some bumps, lines and ridges. Its small branches are smooth and grey, with green at the ends.

The leaves are glossy with erect stinging hairs, particularly on the leaf veins, elliptic in shape, 6 to 13 cm (2.4 to 5.1 in) long, and 3 to 8 cm (1.2 to 3.1 in) wide.

Male and female flowers sometimes occur on separate trees, appearing yellowish green from November to June on small panicles from the leaf axils. The fruit are unevenly shaped nuts or achenes, resembling a mass of white grubs; they mature from January to March. The fruit would be edible for humans if not for the stinging hairs; they are eaten by many rainforest birds, including the regent bowerbird and the Torresian crow.

== Uses ==
Indigenous Australians used the fibres to make nets and bags.
