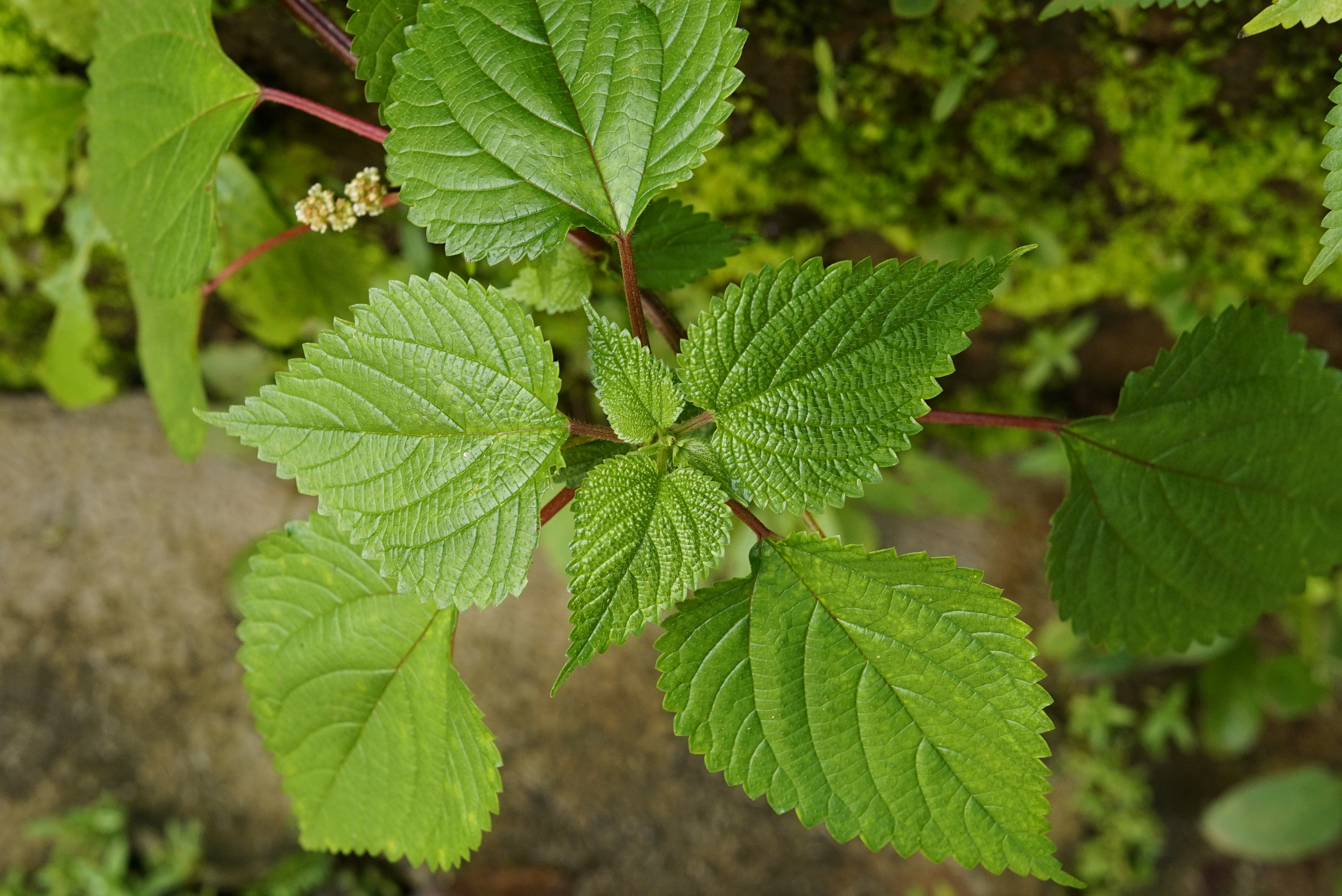

Scientific classification
- Kingdom: Plantae
- Clade: Tracheophytes
- Clade: Angiosperms
- Clade: Eudicots
- Clade: Rosids
- Order: Rosales
- Family: Urticaceae
- Genus: Laportea
- Species: L. interrupta

Binomial name
- Laportea interrupta (L.) Chew

Synonyms
- Tragia interrupta Wedd.(L.) Spreng.; Boehmeria interrupta (L.) Willd.; Fleurya interrupta (L.) Gaudich.; Fleurya spicata var. interrupta (L.) Wedd. ex Seem.; Schychowskya interrupta (L.) W.Wight; Urtica interrupta L.

= Laportea interrupta =

Species of flowering plant

Laportea interrupta is a short-lived annual that grows mainly in seasonally dry tropical regions.

== Description ==
The low growing herb is monoecious annual that typically grows to a height of 0.05 to 2 metres (2.0 in to 6 ft 6.7 in) in height. The leaves and stems are covered in irritant hairs. The plant produced white to cream to green generally during warmer months.

== Distribution ==
It is naturally found across parts of tropical and southern Africa, the Arabian Peninsula, Mozambique, and stretches through Tropical and Subtropical Asia and Northern parts of Australia to the northwestern Pacific.
