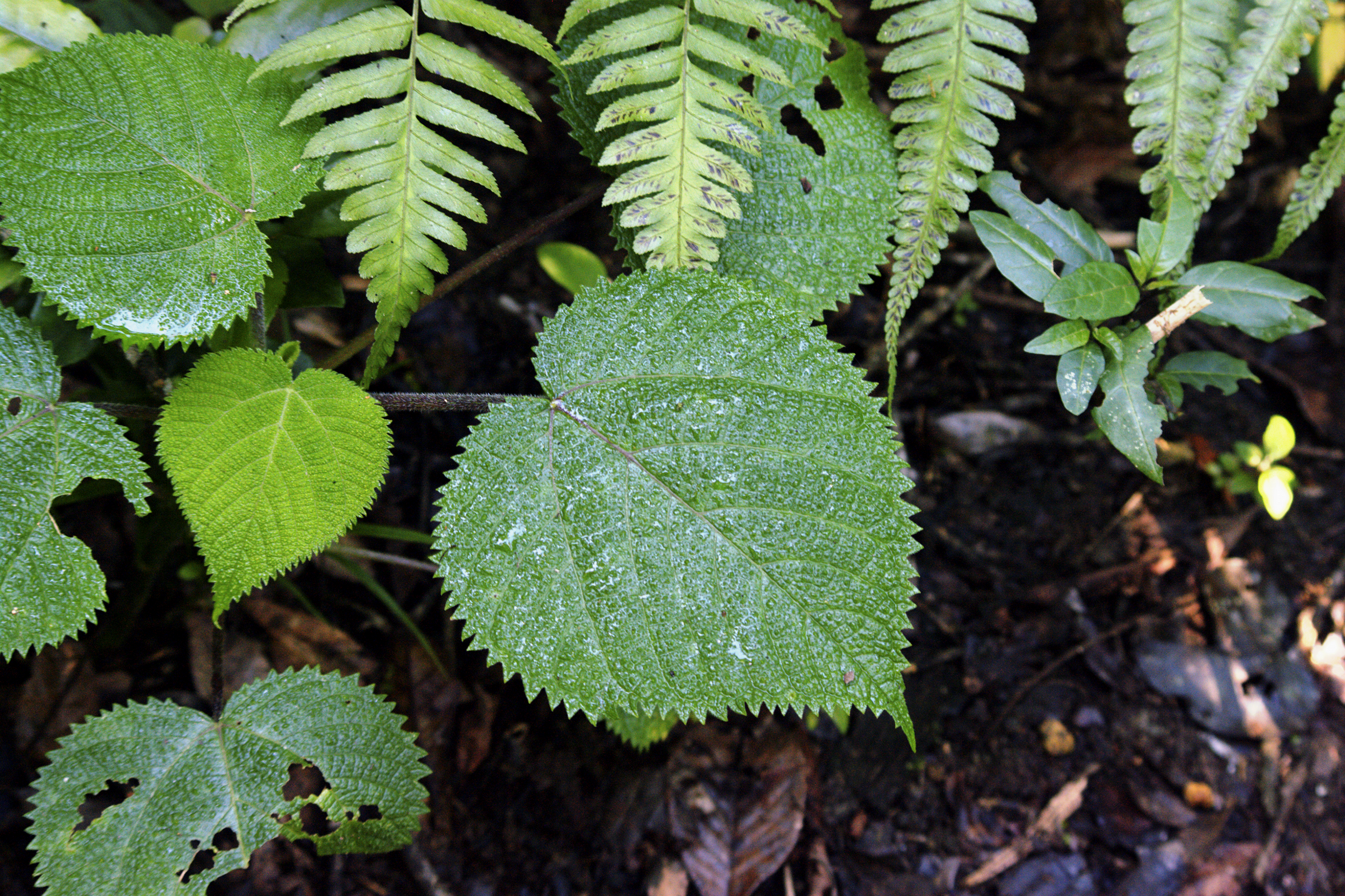
- Young plant

Conservation status
- Least Concern (NCA)

Scientific classification
- Kingdom: Plantae
- Clade: Tracheophytes
- Clade: Angiosperms
- Clade: Eudicots
- Clade: Rosids
- Order: Rosales
- Family: Urticaceae
- Genus: Dendrocnide
- Species: D. cordifolia

Binomial name
- Dendrocnide cordifolia (L.S.Sm.) Jackes & Hurley
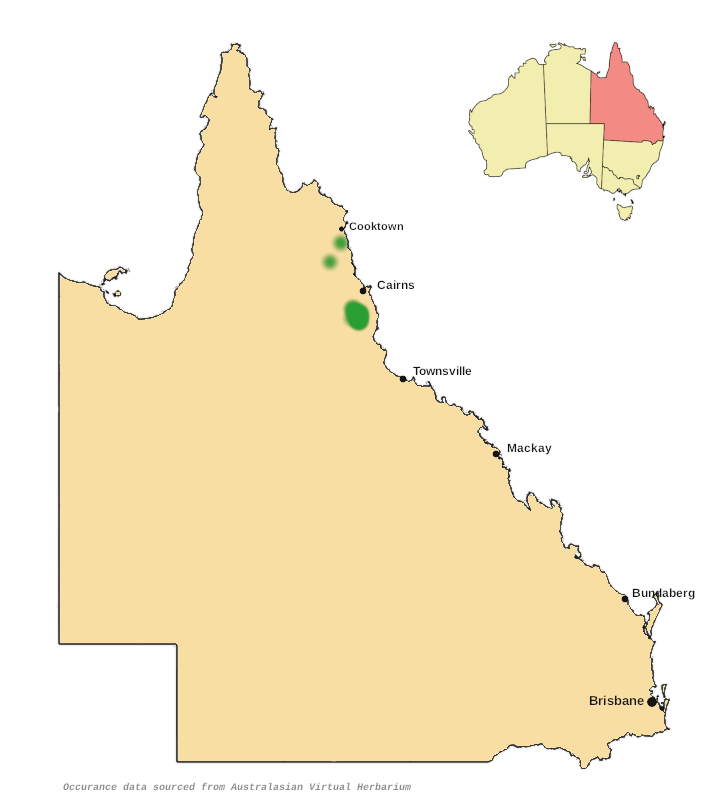

Synonyms
- Laportea cordifolia L.S.Sm.

= Dendrocnide cordifolia =

Stinging tree

Species of flowering plant

Dendrocnide cordifolia, commonly known as the stinging tree, is a plant in the nettle family Urticaceae endemic to the Atherton Tablelands, southwest of Cairns, Queensland. Contact with the plant (like many others in the family) results in a painful sting, however the intensity and duration of the pain from this plant is extreme.

== Description ==
D. cordifolia is a straggly perennial shrub growing up to 10 m (33 ft) high, and the entire plant is covered with stinging hairs. It has large cordate leaves measuring up to 25 cm (9.8 in) long by 22 cm (8.7 in) wide, with toothed margins and petioles (leaf stems) almost as long as the leaf blade itself.

The inflorescences are up to 6 cm (2.4 in) long and bisexual, i.e. consisting of both staminate (functionally male) and pistillate (functionally female) flowers. The flowers are quite small, about 1.5–2 mm (0.06–0.08 in) wide.

The fruit are achenes about 1.5 mm (0.059 in) long. They are partly surrounded by a white, globular, fleshy body derived from the swollen pedicel and is somewhat similar in appearance to a small white raspberry.

== Taxonomy ==
This species was first described as Laportea cordifolia in 1959 by the Australian botanist Lindsay Stuart Smith and was published in the journal Proceedings of the Royal Society of Queensland His description was based on a specimen he collected in 1957 near Atherton, Queensland. In 1969 the Singaporean botanist Wee-Lek Chew, in his paper titled Laportia and Allied Genera, merged L. cordifolia with Dendrocnide cordata and for almost 30 years that remained the status quo. However, in 1997, the Australian botanists Betsy Jackes and Marina Hurley showed that there were errors in Chew's work, and published a paper in Austrobaileya which reinstated L. cordifolia as a distinct species, but under the new combination that remains today, i.e. Dendrocnide cordifolia.

=== Etymology ===
The genus name Dendrocnide is derived from the Ancient Greek words déndron, meaning "tree", and knídē, meaning "stinging needle". The species epithet cordifolia is a Latin word derived from cor (heart) and folium (leaf), which is a reference to the heart-shaped leaves of this species.

== Distribution and habitat ==
D. cordifolia is restricted to a small part of north-eastern Queensland, specifically the Atherton Tableland and nearby areas, at elevations from 100 to 1,200 m (330 to 3,940 ft). It grows as an understory plant in disturbed areas of rainforest, such as treefalls, creek margins, roadsides, and man-made clearings.

== Conservation ==
This species is listed by the Queensland Department of Environment and Science as least concern. As of 28 March 2021, it has not been assessed by the IUCN.

== Toxicity ==
D. cordifolia produces intense pain when a person comes into contact with any part of the plant, very similar to the more well-known and closely related D. moriodes. A detailed discussion of the toxicity of both of these plants can be found in the D. moroides article.

== Gallery ==
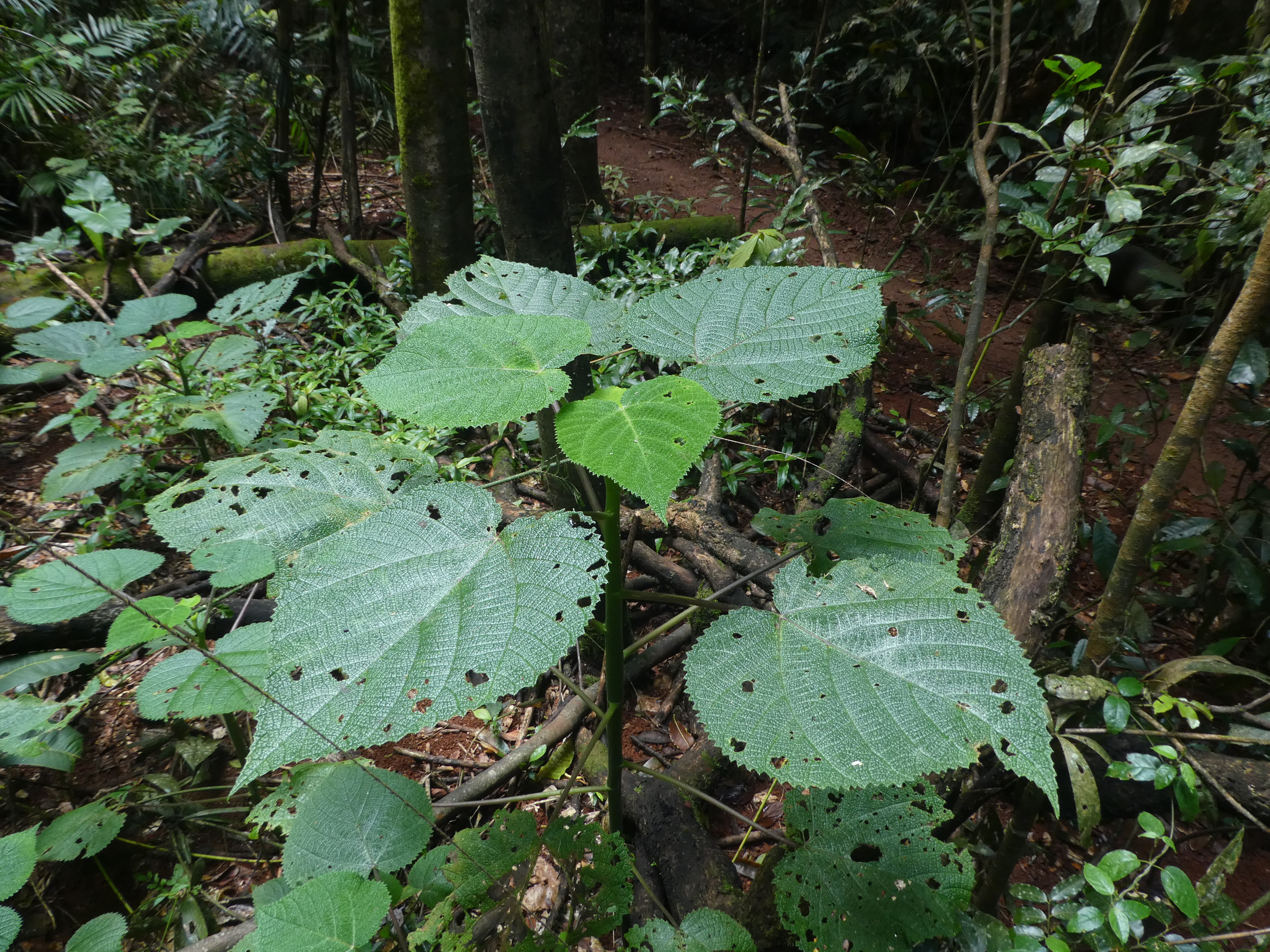

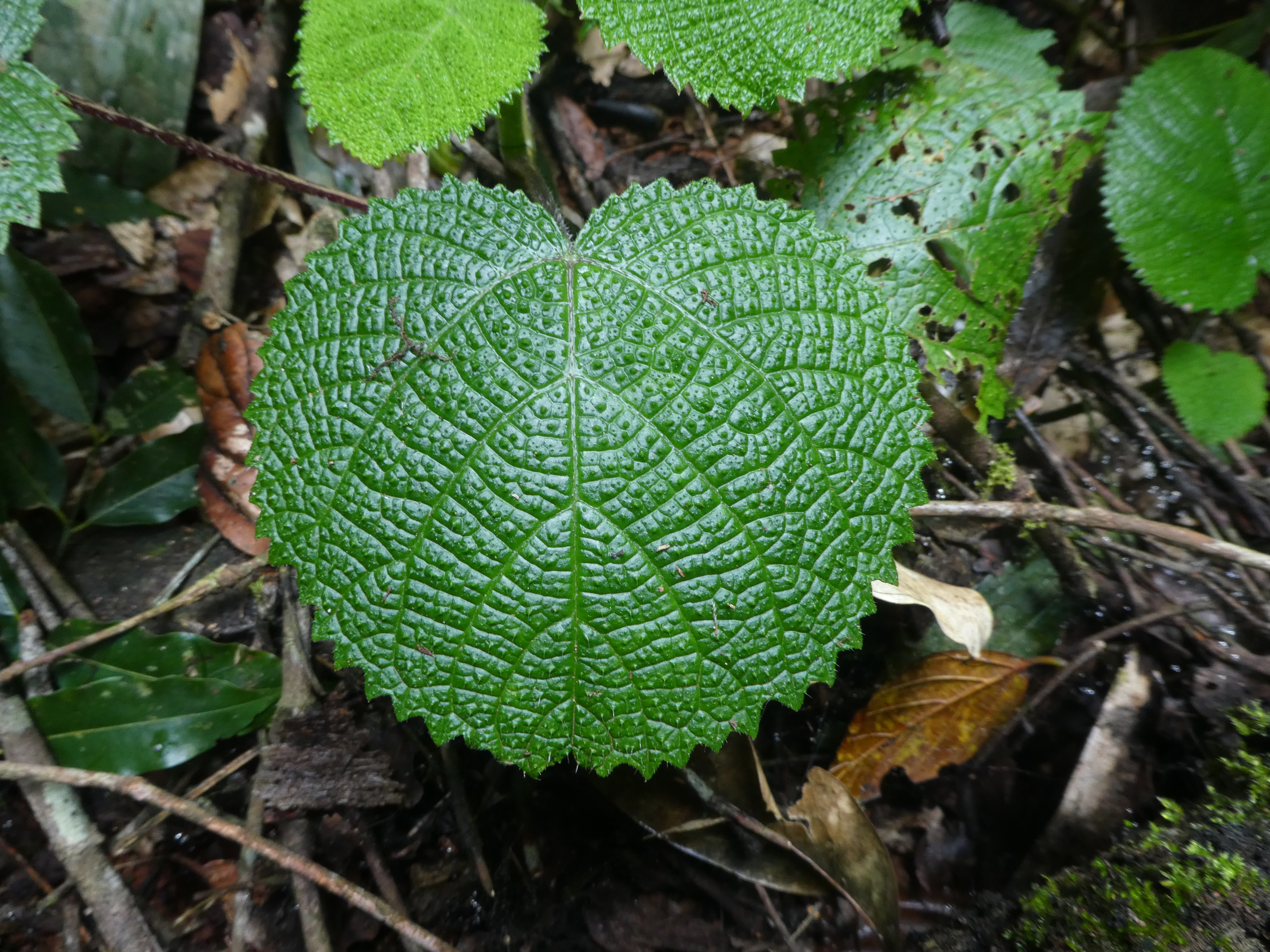

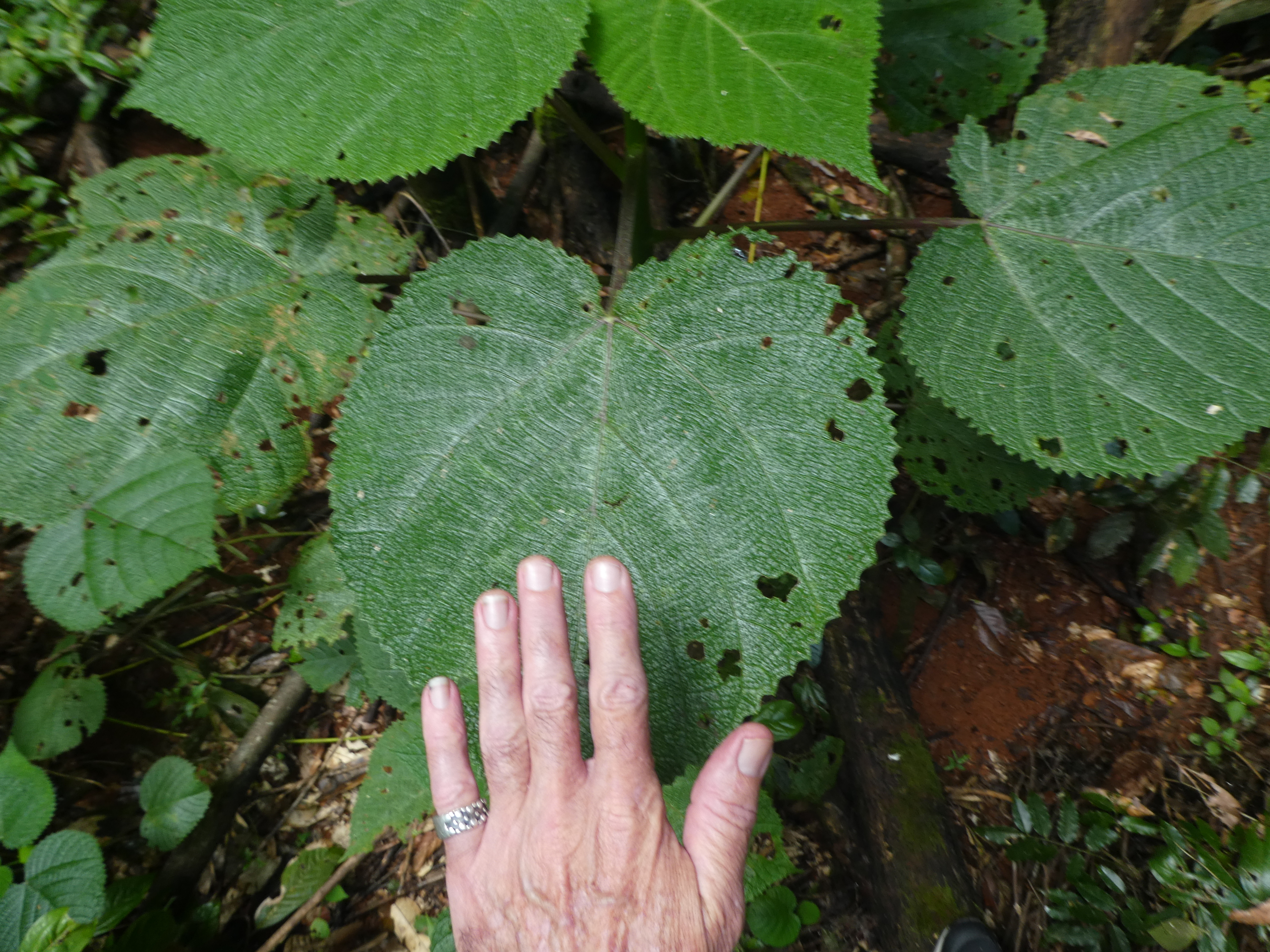

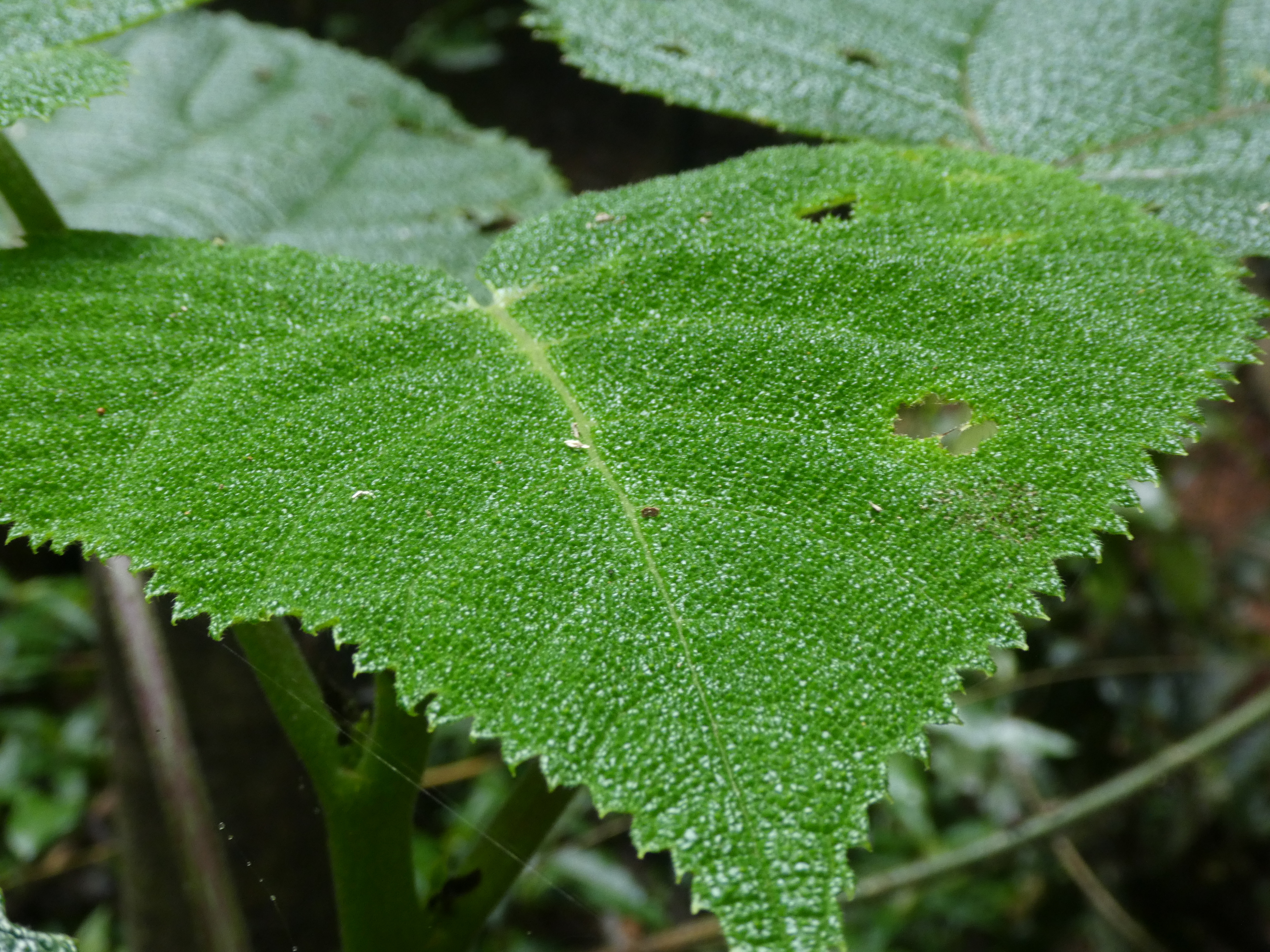
