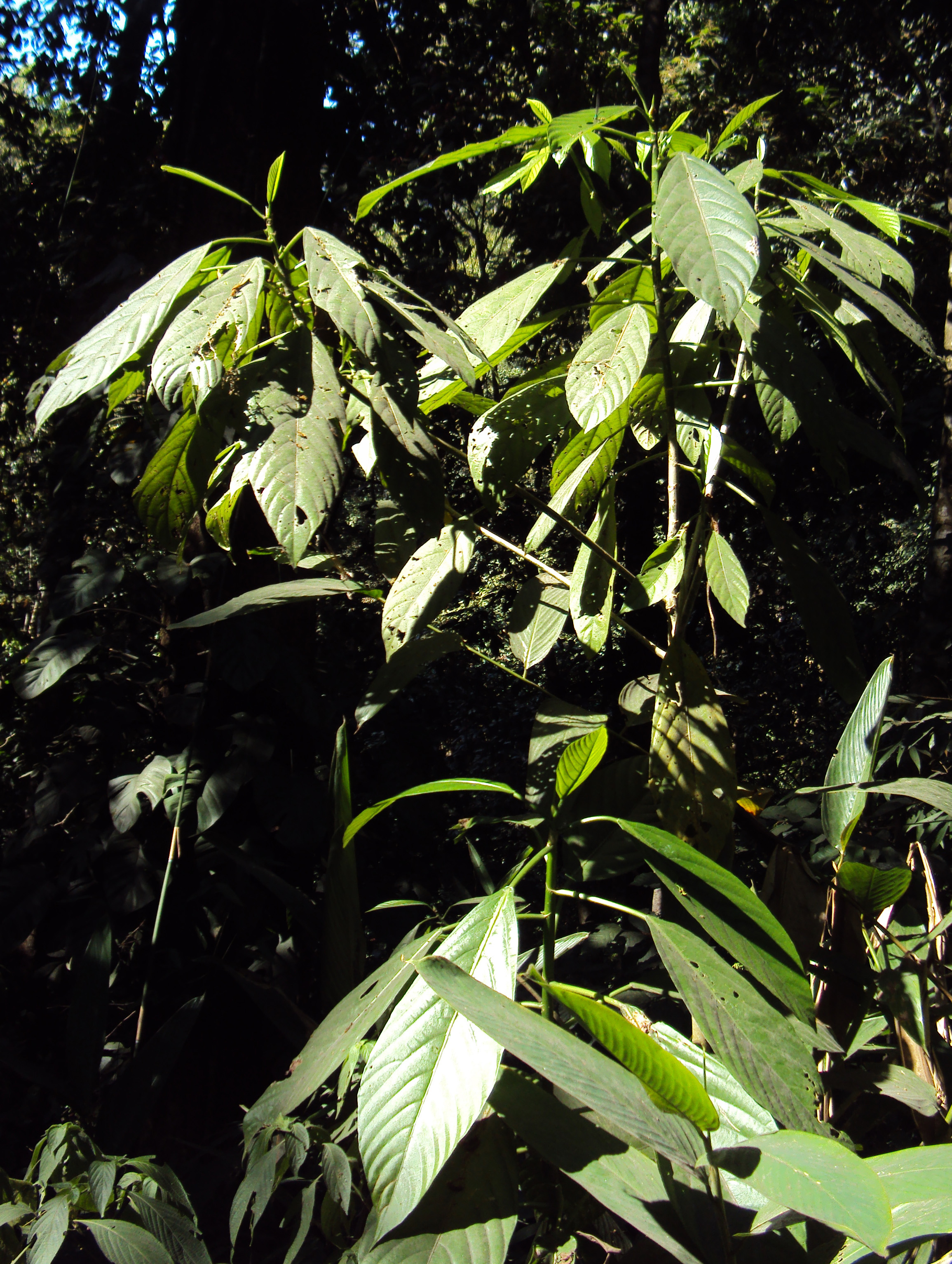

Scientific classification
- Kingdom: Plantae
- Clade: Tracheophytes
- Clade: Angiosperms
- Clade: Eudicots
- Clade: Rosids
- Order: Rosales
- Family: Urticaceae
- Genus: Dendrocnide
- Species: D. sinuata

Binomial name
- Dendrocnide sinuata (Blume) Chew

Synonyms
- Urtica sinuata Blume; Laportea crenulata (Roxb.) Gaud.

= Dendrocnide sinuata =

Species of flowering plant

Dendrocnide sinuata (meaning "tree nettle" with "wavy leaf margin" in Greek) is a poisonous plant called pulutus, pulus, stinging tree, fever nettle, or elephant nettle, growing in subtropical wet evergreen forests throughout Asia. Some of its uses in herbal medicine have been scientifically validated.

== Distribution ==
This nettle grows along streams and among understorey trees in wet evergreen forests between 300 metres (980 ft) – 850 metres (2,790 ft) but up to 1,200 metres (3,900 ft) elevation. It is found in the forests of the Western Ghats of South India, Sri Lanka, Bihar, Northeast India and onwards into Burma. Bhutan. Sikkim, Thailand, Malaysia and (S Guangdong, SW Guangxi, Hainan, S Tibet and SW Yunnan provinces of China)

This nettle is a major shrub species in the tropical evergreen forests of the lower reaches of Khasi Hills and Garo hills of Meghalaya, India, up to 1,200 metres (3,900 ft). There is a camp named 'Sessni' in Eaglenest Wildlife Sanctuary in the Himalayan foothills of West Kameng District in Arunachal Pradesh, India, which in the Nishi peoples language means Nettle. The place is filled with nettle on either side of the road.

== Description ==
The plants are large shrubs or small trees up to 5 metres (16 ft) tall.
The bark is white and smooth with lenticellate blaze.
Whitish. branchlets are terete (cylindrical and circular in cross section) with glandular stinging hairs.
Leaves are simple, alternate, spiral, with stipule caducous (falling off prematurely or easily) and leaving scar
Petiole is 2–6 centimetres (0.79–2.36 in) long, terete, with glandular stinging hairs.
Lamina parts of the leaves are 9.5–34 centimetres (3.7–13.4 in) x 2–11.5 centimetres (0.79–4.53 in), narrow oblanceolate to elliptic, apex acuminate, base attenuate-cuneate to obtuse, margin subentire or crenulate, coriaceous, with glandular stinging hairs; midrib raised above; secondary_nerves 8-11 pairs; tertiary nerves distantly obliquely percurrent.
Flowers with inflorescence axillary panicles, drooping, to 20 centimetres (7.9 in) long. Flowers are unisexual, subsessile.
Fruit and seed are achenes.

== Medical ==
Upon contact with skin the nettle causes a painful itch, hives, fever and chills, skin depressions and clamminess which can recur over 10 days to six months. About 1820, Jean Baptiste Louis Claude Theodore Leschenault de la Tour, the French botanist, described the pain caused by the nettle to be like "rubbing my fingers with hot iron". Jean Baptiste also suffered jaw muscle contractions so severe that he feared he had tetanus.

It's not sure what toxin in the plant causes such severe reactions but formic acid, serotonin, histamine, oxalic acid and tartaric acid are some of the suspects. When the antidote lime juice or turmeric is smeared on the affected areas apparently the symptoms immediately subside.

The juice of the root is reported to be used in chronic fevers. The roots are also boiled in water and the decoction is given to cure jaundice. The roots and leaves are used to prepare poultice and applied to heal boils, carbuncles, wounds, burns and rashes. The root extract has strong antibacterial activity against both Gram (+) and Gram (-) bacteria due to presence of 2a, 3, 21, 24, 28-pentahydroxy-olean-12-enes.

Dendrocnide sinuata has been used as medicine for curing diverse ailments including fever, chronic fever, malaria, dysentery, urinary disorder, Irregular menstruation, swelling, blind abscesses and hypersensitivity by most ethnic tribal communities of North East India including the Nishi, Apatani, Adibasi, Karbis. Dimasa, Khasi and Riang.

The stem-bark yields a strong cordage fibre. The fiber is also used to make coarse cloth. The flowers are reported to be used in curries in North Lakhimpur, Assam. The seeds are chewed to freshen breath.

== Additional sources ==
- Anonymous. 1962. Wealth of India, Raw Materials, 6: 34–35. Council of Scientific & Industrial Research, New Delhi.
- Chopra, R.N., S.L. Nayar & I.C. Chopra. 1956. Glossary of Indian Medicinal Plants, p. 150. Council of Scientific & Industrial Research, New Delhi.
- Rahman, M.M., A. Khan, M.E. Haque & M.M. Rahman. 2008. Antimicrobial and cytotoxic activities of Laportea crenulata. Fitoterapia79: 584–586
