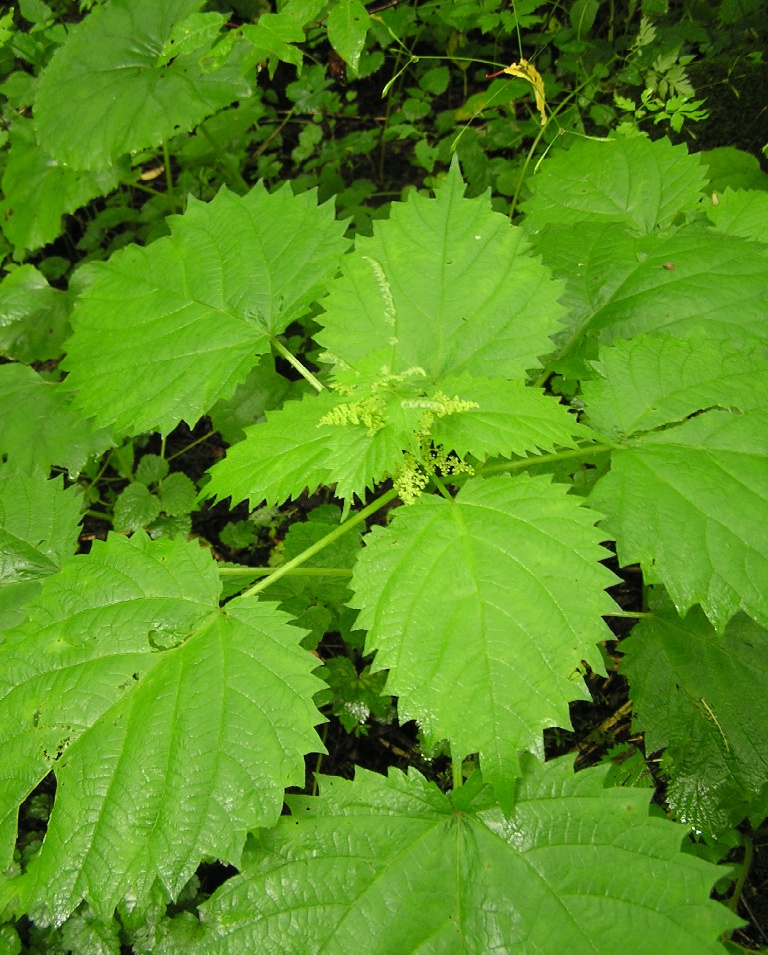
- Laportea cuspidata

Scientific classification
- Kingdom: Plantae
- Clade: Tracheophytes
- Clade: Angiosperms
- Clade: Eudicots
- Clade: Rosids
- Order: Rosales
- Family: Urticaceae
- Tribe: Urticeae
- Genus: Laportea; Gaudich.

Synonyms
- Fleurya Gaudich.; Fleuryopsis Opiz; Haynea Schumach. & Thonn., nom. illeg. homonym. post.; Kermula Noronha, nom. nud.; Oblixilis Raf.; Sceptrocnide Maxim.; Schychowskya Endl.; Sclepsion Raf. ex Wedd.; Urticastrum Heist. ex Fabr., nom. rej.

= Laportea =

Genus of flowering plants

Laportea is a genus of flowering plants in the family Urticaceae. They are herbaceous, either annual or perennial. Like many plants of the Urticaceae, they have stinging hairs. There are stinging and non-stinging hairs on the same plant. The genus was named after the French naturalist Francis de Laporte de Castelnau.

== Species ==
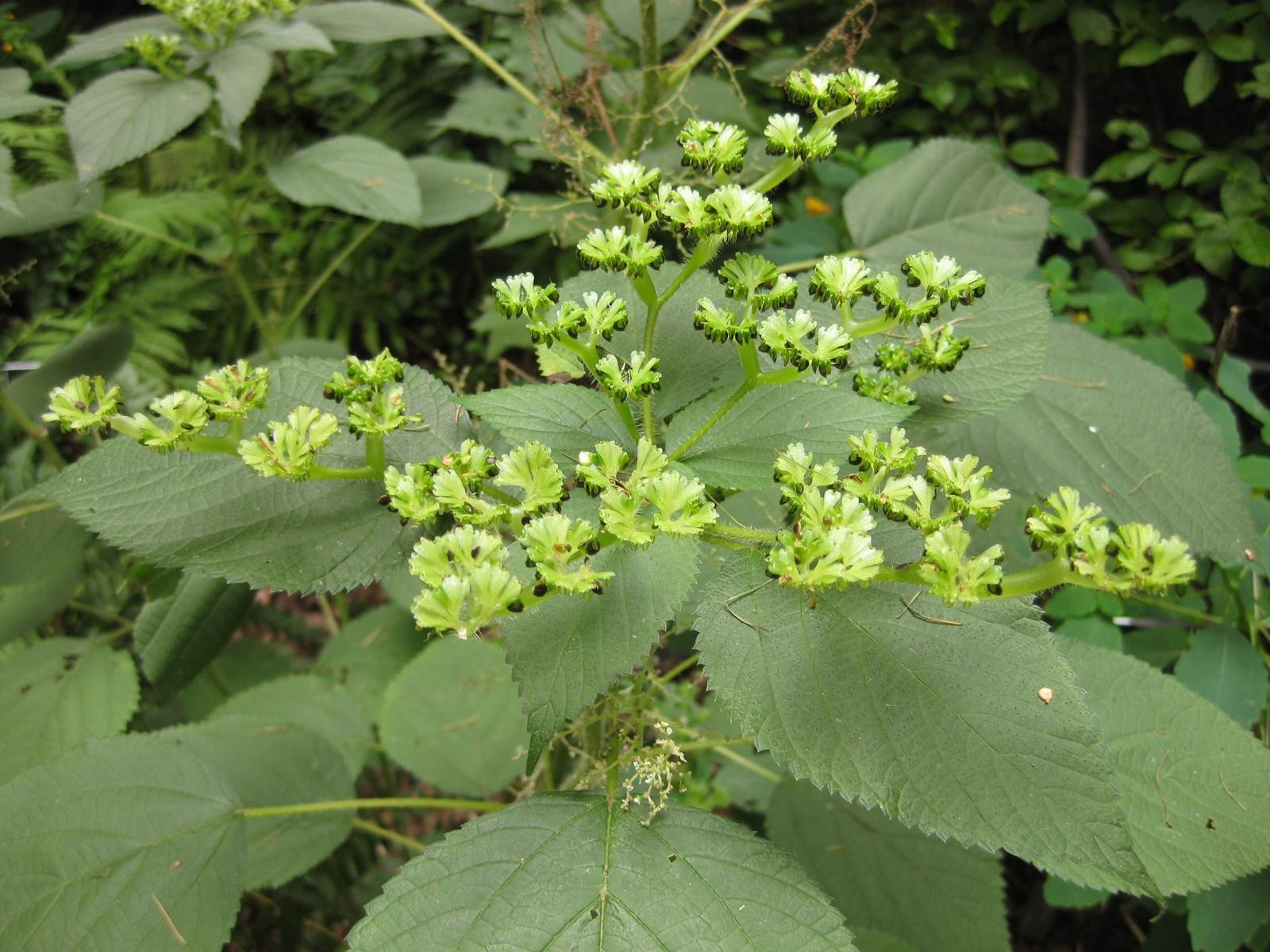
Laportea canadensis

As of September 2026, Kew's Plants of the World Online lists 34 species in the genus Laportea:

- Laportea aestuans (L.) Chew — West Indian woodnettle
- Laportea alatipes Hook.f.
- Laportea amberana (Baker) Leandri
- Laportea bulbifera (Siebold & Zucc.) Wedd.
- Laportea canadensis (L.) Wedd. — Canada nettle
- Laportea cuneata (A.Rich.) Chew
- Laportea cuspidata (Wedd.) Friis
- Laportea decumana (Roxb.) Wedd.
- Laportea disepala (Gagnep.) Chew
- Laportea floribunda (Baker) Leandri
- Laportea fujianensis C.J.Chen
- Laportea grossa (Wedd.) Chew — spotted nettle
- Laportea humblotii (Baill.) Friis
- Laportea humilis Lauterb.
- Laportea interrupta (L.) Chew
- Laportea jinganensis W.T.Wang
- Laportea lageensis W.T.Wang
- Laportea lanceolata (Engl.) Chew
- Laportea laxiflora Wedd.
- Laportea medogensis C.J.Chen
- Laportea mooreana (Hiern) Chew
- Laportea oligoloba (Baker) Friis
- Laportea ovalifolia (Schumach. & Thonn.) Chew
- Laportea peduncularis (Wedd.) Chew — river nettle
- Laportea pedunculata K.Schum. & Lauterb.
- Laportea perrieri Leandri
- Laportea ruderalis (G.Forst.) Chew
- Laportea septentrionalis Leandri
- Laportea stolonifera Bhellum & B.Singh
- Laportea sumatrana Merr.
- Laportea taiwanensis S.S.Ying
- Laportea ventricosa Gagnep.
- Laportea violacea Gagnep.
- Laportea weddellii Leandri
