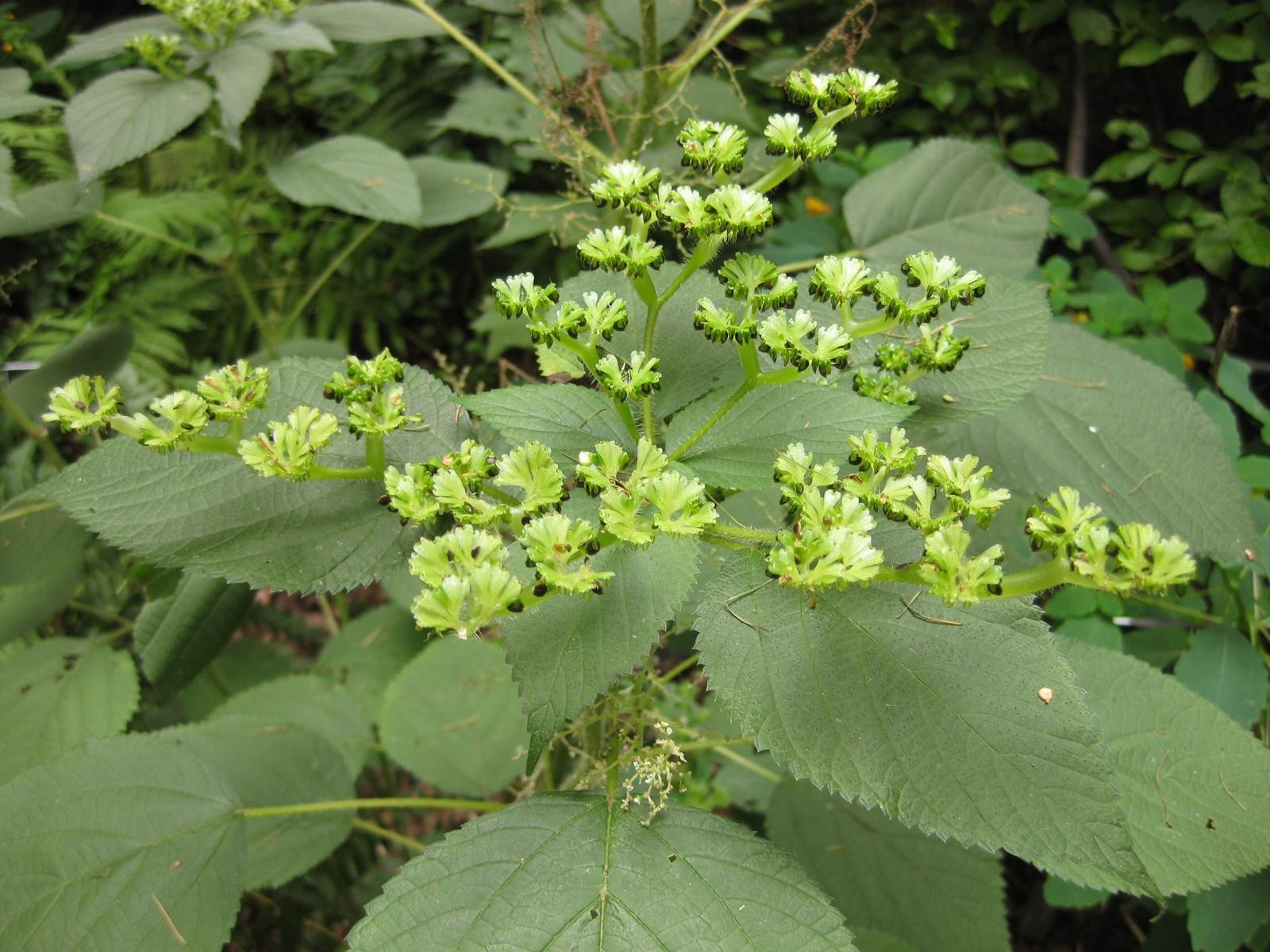

Conservation status
- Secure (NatureServe)

Scientific classification
- Kingdom: Plantae
- Clade: Tracheophytes
- Clade: Angiosperms
- Clade: Eudicots
- Clade: Rosids
- Order: Rosales
- Family: Urticaceae
- Genus: Laportea
- Species: L. canadensis

Binomial name
- Laportea canadensis (L.) Wedd.
- [US,CA, and MX] Laportea canadensis range (note: distribution is incomplete)

Synonyms
- Laportea canadensis (L.) Gaudich.; Laportea divaricata (L.) Lunell; Laportea pustulata (Liebm.) Wedd.; Urtica canadensis L.; Urtica divaricata L.; Urtica pustulata Liebm.; Urticastrum divaricatum (L.) Kuntze

= Laportea canadensis =

Species of flowering plant

Laportea canadensis, commonly called Canada nettle or wood-nettle, is an annual or perennial herbaceous plant of the nettle family Urticaceae, native to eastern and central North America. It is found growing in open woods with moist rich soils and along streams and in drainages.

== Description ==
Laportea canadensis grows from tuberous roots to a height of 30 to 150 centimeters, and can be rhizomatous, growing into small clumps. Plants have both stinging and non-stinging hairs on the foliage and the stems. It has whitish green flowers, produced from spring to early fall. Unlike its cousin, the common nettle, Laportea canadensis has alternate leaves. The bulk of its foliage also grows notably high on the stem.

== Sting ==
When the stinging nettles come in contact with the skin, the unlucky individual is dealt a painful burning stinging sensation, sometimes with barbs left in the skin. The skin can turn red and blister, and blisters can last for several days.
