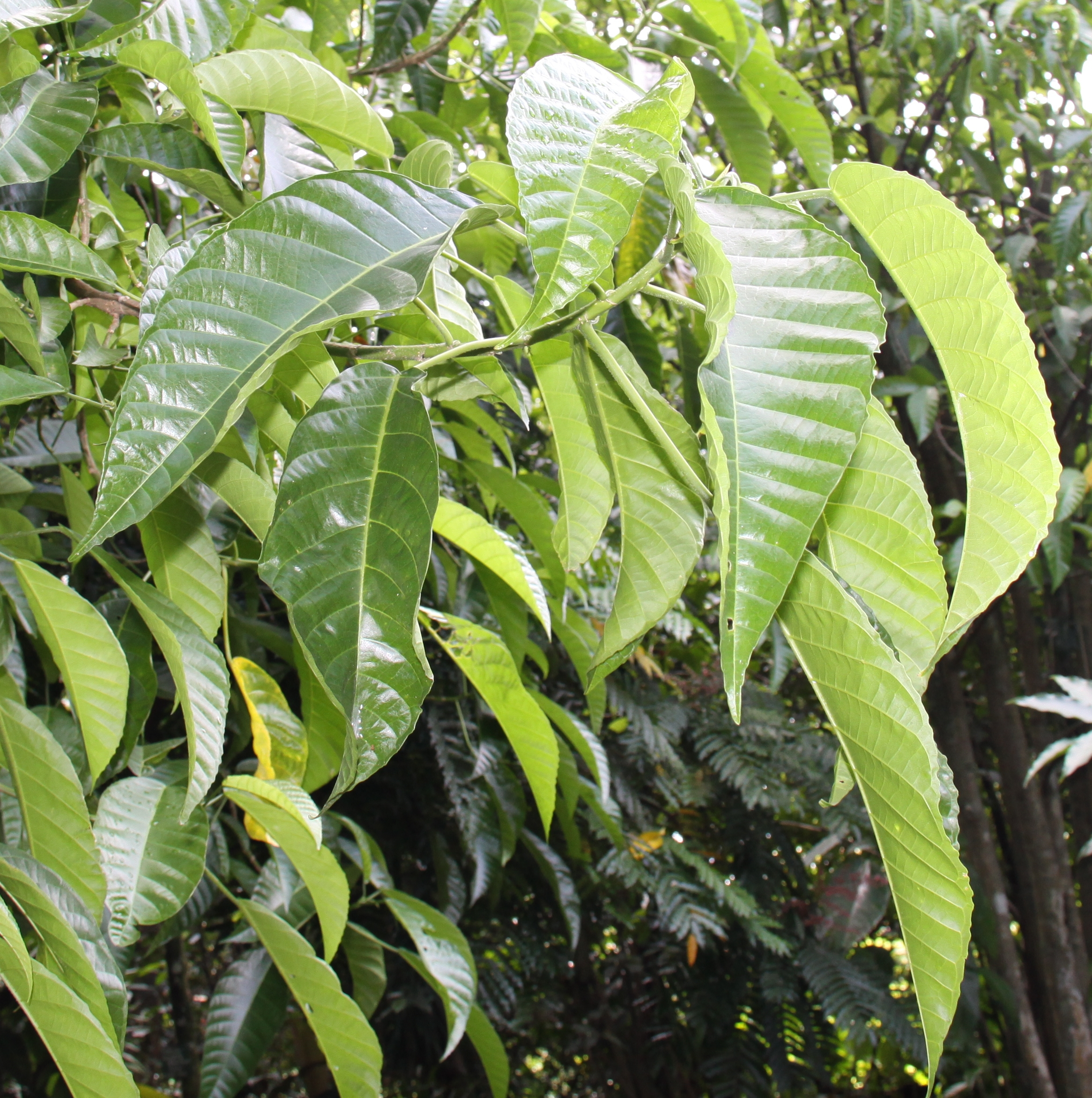
- Dendrocnide stimulans

Scientific classification
- Kingdom: Plantae
- Clade: Tracheophytes
- Clade: Angiosperms
- Clade: Eudicots
- Clade: Rosids
- Order: Rosales
- Family: Urticaceae
- Tribe: Urticeae
- Genus: Dendrocnide; Miq.

Type species
- Dendrocnide costata Miq.

Species
- See text

= Dendrocnide =

Genus of plants in the nettle family

Dendrocnide is a genus of approximately 40 species (Note: Plants of the World Online recognises 42 species, Flora of Australia 37, and World Flora Online 43) of plants in the nettle family Urticaceae. They have a wide distribution across North East India, Southeast Asia, Australia and the Pacific Islands. In Australia they are commonly known as stinging trees.

== Description ==
Plants in this genus are evergreen shrubs or small trees, with the exception of the aptly-named giant stinging tree (D. excelsa) which may reach 35 m (115 ft) in height. Dendrocnide species have a sympodial growth habit and are armed with fine needle-like stinging hairs. They are generally fast-growing and produce soft wood, and are usually found in areas of disturbed forest where they fill the role of a pioneer species.

The leaves are simple, alternate, and petiolate, (i.e. having long petioles or leaf-stems), and the leaf blade may be either entire or have some form of dentate toothing (notches or teeth on the edges of the leaf). The leaves are also often large, and may be either leathery or papery. The stipules are fused and deciduous, leaving conspicuous scars on the twigs after falling.

The inflorescences are axillary and pedunculate, flowers are either solitary or in racemes or panicles. Male flowers may be 4- or 5-merous and the female flowers are 4-merous. Most species are dioecious, a small number are monoecious.

Fruits are an achene, often compressed, and may be eclosed within the swollen pedicel.

== Taxonomy ==
The genus Dendrocnide was raised in 1851 by the Dutch physician, botanist, and taxonomist Friedrich Anton Wilhelm Miquel (1811–1871) who dedicated a large part of his life to describing specimens of the flora of the Dutch East Indies which were sent to him by his many contacts. This genus was first published in the work Plantae Junghuhnianae, in which he described three species, namely D. peltata, D. costata (the original type species that is now known as D. stimulans) and D. coerulea.

=== Etymology ===
The name of this genus comes from Ancient Greek déndron (tree), and knī́dē (nettle), referring to the large size of most species in this genus.

== List of species ==
The following is a list of all 41 species recognised by Plants of the World Online (POWO) as of 22 March 2025, with a brief summary of their distribution.

- Dendrocnide amplissima (Blume) Chew – Maluku Islands, Sulawesi
- Dendrocnide basirotunda (C.Y.Wu) Chew – China south-central, Myanmar, Thailand
- Dendrocnide carriana Chew – Lesser Sunda Islands, Maluku Islands, New Guinea, Philippines
- Dendrocnide celebica Chew – Sulawesi
- Dendrocnide contracta (Blume) Chew – Java
- Dendrocnide corallodesme (Lauterb.) Chew – New Guinea, Queensland
- Dendrocnide cordata (Warb. ex H.J.P.Winkl.) Chew – Lesser Sunda Islands, New Guinea, Bismarck Archipelago
- Dendrocnide cordifolia (L.S.Sm.) Jackes – Queensland
- Dendrocnide crassifolia (C.B.Rob.) Chew – Philippines, Sulawesi
- Dendrocnide densiflora (C.B.Rob.) Chew – Philippines
- Dendrocnide elliptica (Merr.) Chew – Borneo, Philippines
- Dendrocnide excelsa (Wedd.) Chew – New South Wales, Queensland
- Dendrocnide gigantea (Poir.) Chew – Melanesia
- Dendrocnide harveyi (Seem.) Chew – Cook Islands, Fiji, Niue, Samoa, Tonga
- Dendrocnide kajewskii Chew – Solomon Islands
- Dendrocnide kjellbergii Chew – Sulawesi
- Dendrocnide kotoensis (Hayata ex Yamam.) B.L.Shih & Yuen P.Yang – Taiwan
- Dendrocnide latifolia (Gaudich.) Chew – Caroline Islands, Marianas, New Caledonia, Solomon Islands, Vanuatu
- Dendrocnide longifolia (Hemsl.) Chew – Bismarck Archipelago, Maluku Islands, New Guinea, Solomon Islands, Sulawesi
- Dendrocnide luzonensis (Wedd.) Chew – Philippines
- Dendrocnide meyeniana (Walp.) Chew – Philippines, Taiwan
- Dendrocnide microstigma (Wedd.) Chew – Java, Lesser Sunda Islands, Maluku Islands, Sulawesi
- Dendrocnide mirabilis (Rech.) Chew – New Guinea, Solomon Islands
- Dendrocnide morobensis Chew – New Guinea
- Dendrocnide moroides (Wedd.) Chew – Lesser Sunda Islands, New South Wales, Queensland, Vanuatu
- Dendrocnide nervosa (H.J.P.Winkl.) Chew – New Guinea, Solomon Islands
- Dendrocnide oblanceolata (Merr.) Chew – Borneo, Sulawesi
- Dendrocnide peltata (Blume) Miq. – Christmas Island, Java, Lesser Sunda Islands, New Guinea
- Dendrocnide photiniphylla (Kunth) Chew – New South Wales, Queensland
- Dendrocnide pruritivus H.St.John – Fiji, Wallis and Futuna
- Dendrocnide rechingeri (H.J.P.Winkl.) Chew – Bismarck Archipelago, New Guinea, Solomon Islands
- Dendrocnide rigidifolia (C.B.Rob.) Chew – Philippines
- Dendrocnide schlechteri (H.J.P.Winkl.) Chew – Bismarck Archipelago, New Guinea, Solomon Islands
- Dendrocnide sessiliflora (Warb.) Chew – Bismarck Archipelago, New Guinea
- Dendrocnide sinuata (Blume) Chew – Nepal to southern China and western Malesia including Christmas Island
- Dendrocnide stimulans (L.f.) Chew – China (Guangdong), Hainan, Taiwan, Indo-China, western and central Malesia
- Dendrocnide subclausa (C.B.Rob.) Chew – Philippines
- Dendrocnide ternatensis (Miq.) Chew – Lesser Sunda Islands, Maluku Islands, New Guinea
- Dendrocnide torricellensis (Lauterb.) Chew – New Guinea
- Dendrocnide urentissima (Gagnep.) Chew – Cambodia, south-central and south-east China, Vietnam
- Dendrocnide venosa (Elmer) Chew – Philippines

=== Other taxa ===
In addition to the above, the name Dendrocnide vitiensis (Seem.) Chew is recognised by World Flora Online (WFO), World Plants (WP), and the Global Biodiversity Information Facility (GBIF), while POWO considers it to be a synonym of D. harveyi. GBIF also accepts Dendrocnide moroidea (Wedd.) Chew, which is not listed at all by POWO, WFO or WP. GBIF sources its data for this taxon from The Plant List, which is no longer maintained and is superseded by WFO.
