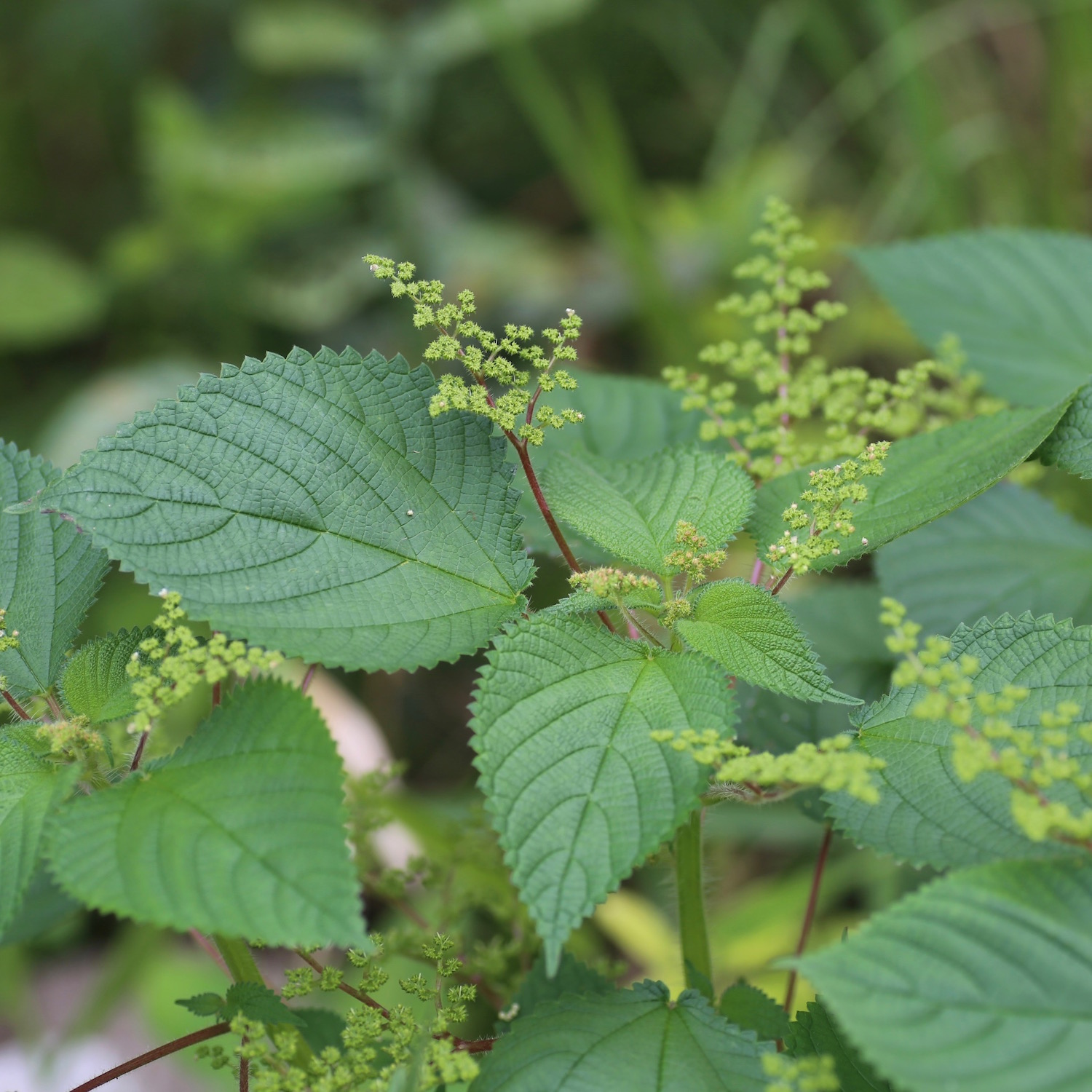
- Laportea aestuans. Ecuador

Scientific classification
- Kingdom: Plantae
- Clade: Tracheophytes
- Clade: Angiosperms
- Clade: Eudicots
- Clade: Rosids
- Order: Rosales
- Family: Urticaceae
- Genus: Laportea
- Species: L. aestuans

Binomial name
- Laportea aestuans (L.) Chew

Synonyms
- Urtica aestuans; Fleurya aestuans (L.) Gaudich.

= Laportea aestuans =

Species of flowering plant

Laportea aestuans (Urtica aestuans), the West Indian woodnettle, is an annual herb of the Urticaceae or nettle family.

It is possibly native to tropical Africa, although it now is widespread as an introduced species throughout both the western hemisphere and eastern hemisphere tropics and subtropics, including the USA (California, Florida, Puerto Rico), Central America, the West Indies, India, Sumatra and Java.

Laportea aestuans is a food plant for an edible snail, Archachatina ventricosa, native to parts of coastal West Africa. It is a weedy species in Taiwan. It is a possible host reservoir in Nigeria for African cassava mosaic virus, an important plant pest of a major African food crop, Manihot esculenta or cassava.
