= Dendrocnide peltata =

Scientific classification
- Kingdom: Plantae
- Clade: Tracheophytes
- Clade: Angiosperms
- Clade: Eudicots
- Clade: Rosids
- Order: Rosales
- Family: Urticaceae
- Genus: Dendrocnide
- Species: D. peltata

Binomial name
- Dendrocnide peltata (Blume) Miq.

Synonyms
- Urtica peltata Blume; Laportea murrayana Rendle; Dendrocnide peltata subsp. murrayana (Rendle) Chew

Species of tree

Dendrocnide peltata, commonly known simply as the stinging tree or jelaton, is a large tree in the nettle family Urticaceae. With the other species of the genus Dendrocnide, it is known for the stinging hairs which cover the whole plant and cause severe pain when touched. The Latin specific epithet peltata means "shield shaped", referring to the shape of the leaves.

== Description ==
Dendrocnide peltata is a dioecious rainforest tree. Although often encountered as a small, subcanopy tree, it may grow to be a large canopy tree up to 30 m high. The trunk grows to a diameter of 650 mm, and is usually crooked and lacking buttresses, while the bark is green or grey in colour, and rough, scaly or flaky in texture. The large leaves, which are broadly ovate, usually peltate, rounded at the base, crenate, acute to acuminate, dark green above and pale green beneath, are clustered at the ends of the branches. The small flowers grow as axillary inflorescences. The fruits are about 20 mm long, green or brown, with the seeds about 2 mm in diameter.

== Distribution and habitat ==
The two botanic varieties of the tree are:

- Dendrocnide peltata (Blume) Miq. var. peltata is native to Java, Bali, New Guinea and Christmas Island.
- Dendrocnide peltata var. murrayana (Rendle) Chew is endemic to Christmas Island.
