= Wee-Lek Chew =

Singaporean-born botanist

- Born: 1932 (age 93–94); Singapore
- Occupation: Botanist

Academic background
- Education: University of Cambridge
- Thesis: A revision of Poikilospermum (Urticaceae) and Taxotrophis (Moraceae) (1960)
- Doctoral advisor: E. J. H. Corner

Chinese name
- Traditional Chinese: 周偉力
- Simplified Chinese: 周伟力
- Hanyu Pinyin: Zhōu Wěilì
- Hokkien POJ: Chiu Úi-le̍k

Wee-Lek Chew (周偉力; born 1932) is a Singaporean-born botanist.

== Career ==
Chew was born in Singapore in 1932. He did his B.S. in botany at the University of Malaya under Richard Eric Holttum, and following his graduation in 1956 he began working at the Singapore Botanic Gardens. A year later he went to the United Kingdom on a Singapore government fellowship to pursue a Ph.D. at the University of Cambridge, where his advisor was E. J. H. Corner. He completed his studies in 1960, and returned to the Singapore Botanic Gardens that year. He further received a postdoctoral fellowship in 1964. He became the director and ex officio chairman of the Board of Trustees of the Singapore Botanic Gardens in 1969 following the retirement of H. M. Burkill. He resigned the following year and moved to Australia to work at the Royal Botanic Garden, Sydney, and was succeeded as director by A. G. Alphonso. He was named a fellow of the Linnean Society of London in 1974. In 1975 he resigned from his post at the National Herbarium of New South Wales to take up a position with the International Union for Conservation of Nature in Morges, Switzerland. He revised the Australian species in the genus Ficus in 1989 for the Flora of Australia.

== Works ==
- "A Monograph of Laportea (Urticaceae)". Gardens' Bulletin Singapore. 25: 111–178. 1969. OCLC 183122914.
