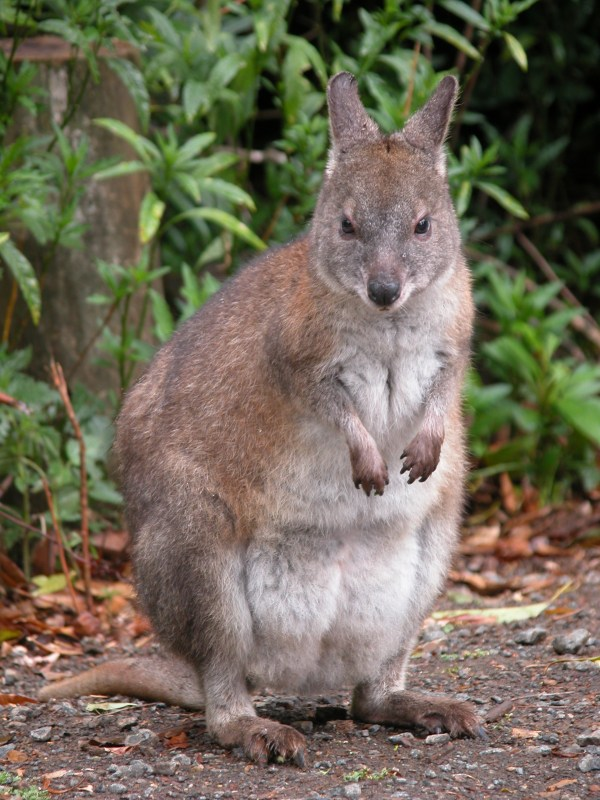

Conservation status
- Least Concern (IUCN 3.1)

Scientific classification
- Kingdom: Animalia
- Phylum: Chordata
- Class: Mammalia
- Infraclass: Marsupialia
- Order: Diprotodontia
- Family: Macropodidae
- Genus: Thylogale
- Species: T. thetis

Binomial name
- Thylogale thetis (Lesson, 1828)
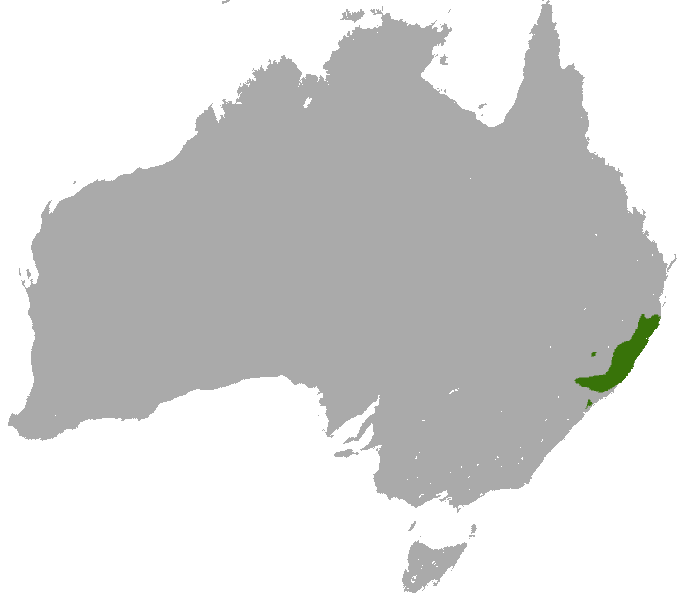
- Red-necked pademelon range

= Red-necked pademelon =

Species of marsupial

The red-necked pademelon (Thylogale thetis) is a forest-dwelling marsupial living in the eastern coastal region of Australia between extreme south-east Queensland and central eastern New South Wales.

== Description ==
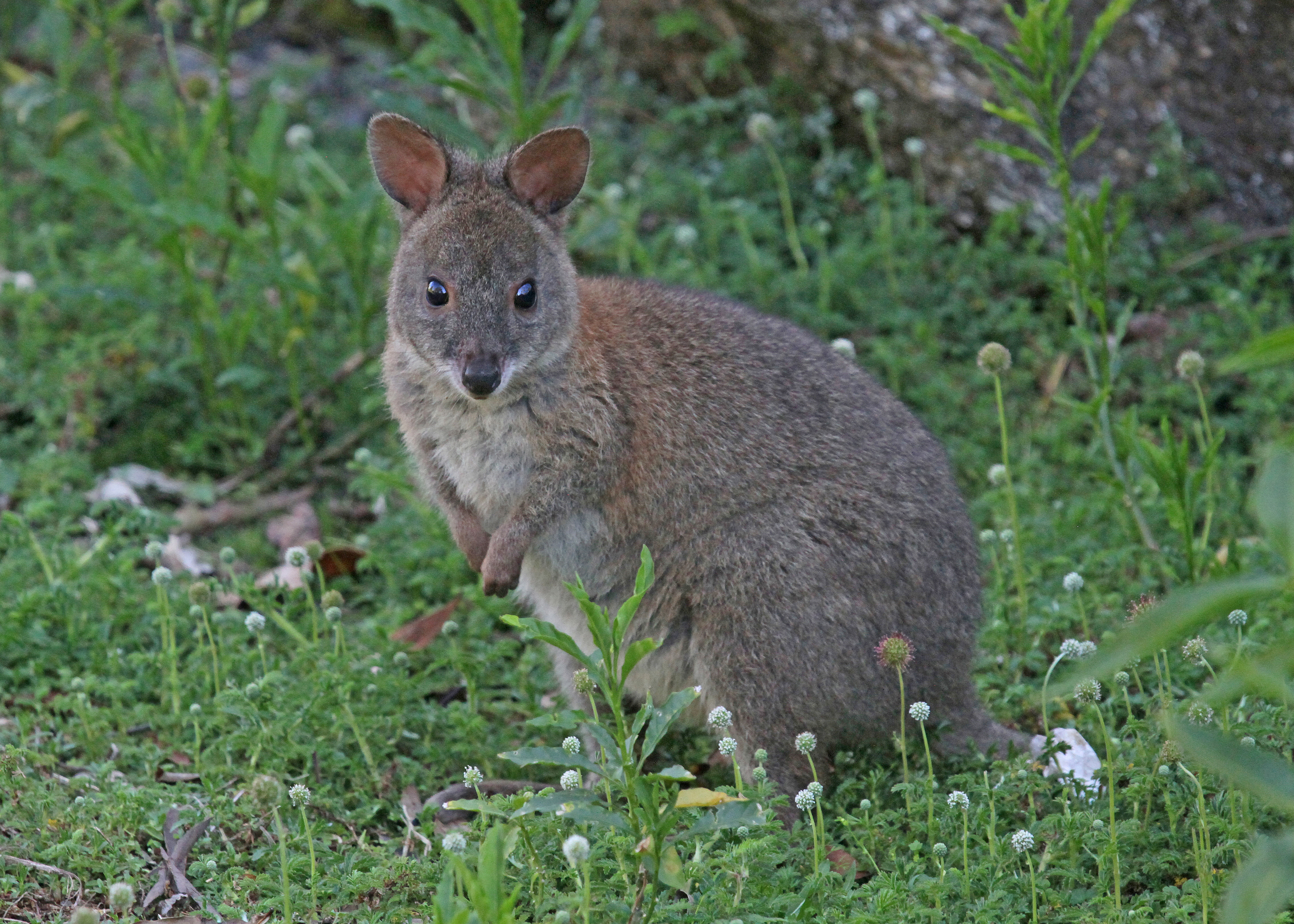
Red-necked pademelon in Lamington National Park, Queensland, Australia

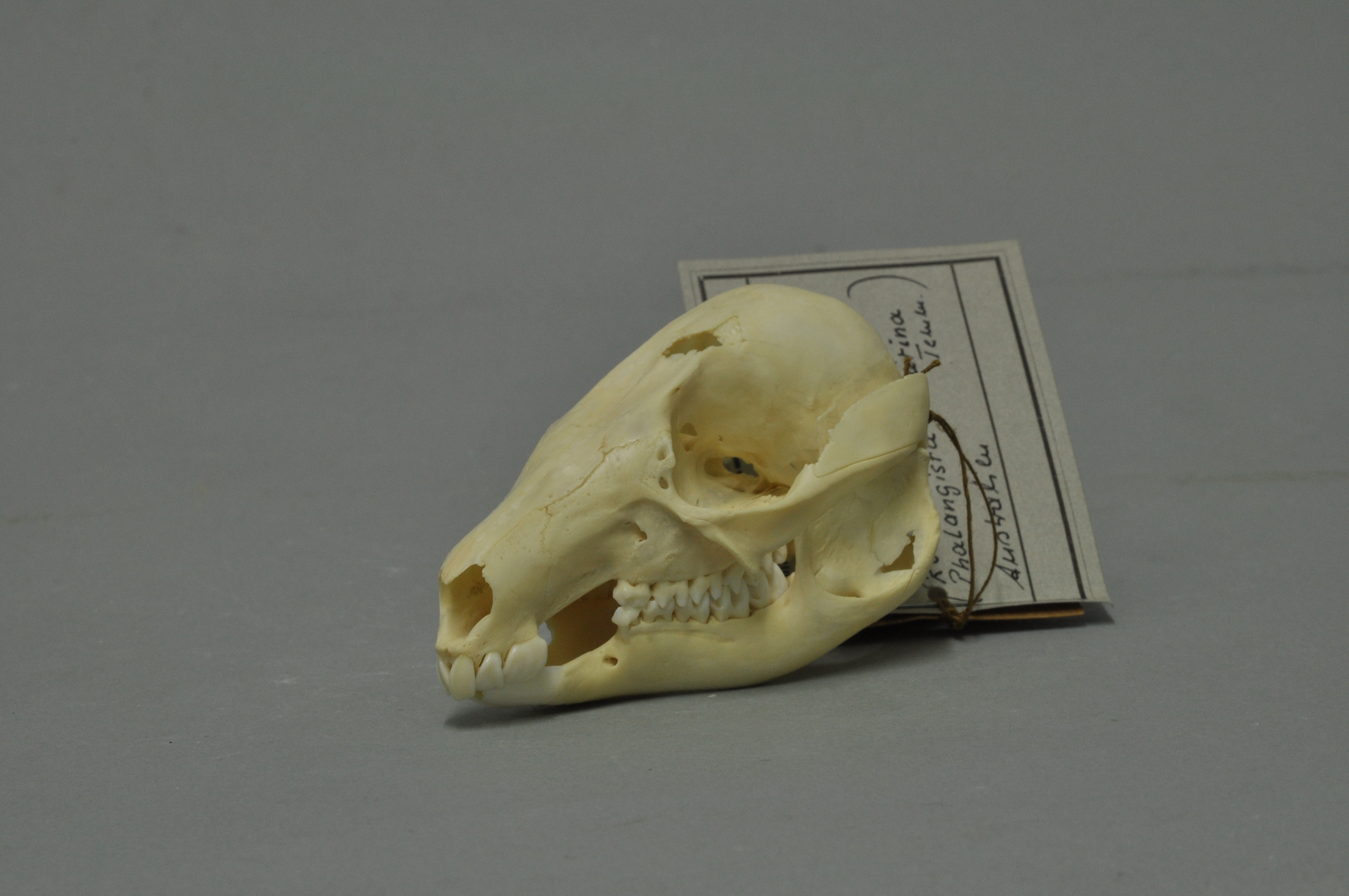
Skull of a red-necked pademelon

A small species of macropod, it has a head and body length of 29–62 cm, a tail length of 27–51 cm and mean weight of 3.8 kg for females and 7.0 kg for males. Mainly crepuscular, the red-necked pademelon is very shy and generally inhabits temperate forests near grassland, hiding in the forests by day and emerging into the grasslands to graze in the dusk.

The red-necked pademelon is brown-grey with a cream underbelly and a red-tinted neck and shoulders. It breeds in the autumn and spring in northern Australia, and in the summer in southern Australia. Predators include the dingo and the red fox, however habitat destruction, particularly through land clearance, is currently the largest threat to the species. The red-necked pademelon is not currently listed as an endangered species.

This species is closely related to the red-legged pademelon.
