= Gimpy =

Gimpy most often means physically lame and is a derogatory term for someone who has a limp. It may also refer to:

== Nickname ==
- Lloyd Brown (1904–1974), American Major League Baseball pitcher
- Stephen Mowlam (born 1976), Australian field hockey goalkeeper
- Dean O'Banion (1892–1924), Irish-American mobster and rival of Al Capone in the 1920s
- Milt Pappas (1939–2016), American Major League Baseball pitcher
- Gwen Verdon (1925–2000), American actress and dancer whose childhood nickname was "Gimpy"

== Fictional characters ==
- Gimpy, a main character in the animated television series Undergrads
- "Gimpy" McHenry, protagonist of Manpower (1941 film), played by Edward G. Robinson
- "Gimpy" Smith, a main character in Streets of New York (1939 film)
- Colonel Gimpy, villain of Crack-Up (1936 film), played by Peter Lorre

== Other uses ==
- Nickname for the General-purpose machine gun, particularly by the British armed forces

== See also ==
- "Gympie gympie" – colloquial name for the Australian "stinging brush" or Dendrocnide moroides
