= Moroidin =

Names
- IUPAC name (8S,9S,12S,15S,18S,21S,27S)-21-[3-(diaminomethylideneamino)propyl]-12-(2-methylpropyl)-10,13,16,19,22,25-hexaoxo-9-{[(2S)-5-oxopyrrolidine-2-carbonyl]amino}-8,15-di(propan-2-yl)-2,11,14,17,20,23,26,30,32-nonazapentacyclo[16.14.2.1^{3,7}.1^{29,32}.0^{4,33}]hexatriaconta-1(33),3,5,7(36),29(35),30-hexaene-27-carboxylic acid

Identifiers
CAS Number	104041-75-0
3D model (JSmol)	Interactive image
ChEMBL	ChEMBL385762
ChemSpider	10356647
PubChem CID	14311394
CompTox Dashboard (EPA)	DTXSID901337162
- InChI: InChI=1S/C47H66N14O10/c1-21(2)14-31-43(67)59-37(23(5)6)44(68)58-32-17-27-26-10-9-24(36(22(3)4)38(45(69)57-31)60-41(65)29-11-12-34(62)53-29)15-30(26)55-39(27)61-19-25(52-20-61)16-33(46(70)71)54-35(63)18-51-40(64)28(56-42(32)66)8-7-13-50-47(48)49/h9-10,15,19-23,28-29,31-33,36-38,55H,7-8,11-14,16-18H2,1-6H3,(H,51,64)(H,53,62)(H,54,63)(H,56,66)(H,57,69)(H,58,68)(H,59,67)(H,60,65)(H,70,71)(H4,48,49,50)/t28-,29-,31-,32-,33-,36+,37-,38-/m0/s1 Key: UCSHFBQCLZMAJY-QFMFBHDYSA-N
- SMILES: CC(C)C[C@H]1C(=O)N[C@H](C(=O)N[C@H]2Cc3c4ccc(cc4[nH]c3-n5cc(nc5)C[C@H](NC(=O)CNC(=O)[C@@H](NC2=O)CCCNC(=[NH2+])N)C(=O)[O-])[C@H]([C@@H](C(=O)N1)NC(=O)[C@@H]6CCC(=O)N6)C(C)C)C(C)C

Properties
Chemical formula	C_{47}H_{66}N_{14}O_{10}
Molar mass	987.133 g·mol^{−1}
- Except where otherwise noted, data are given for materials in their standard state (at 25 °C [77 °F], 100 kPa). Infobox references

Moroidin is a biologically active compound found in the plants Dendrocnide moroides and Celosia argentea. It is an octapeptide composed of eight amino acids, with unusual leucine-tryptophan and tryptophan-histidine cross-links that form a unique bicyclic structure. Moroidin has been shown to be at least one of several bioactive compounds responsible for the painful sting of the Dendrocnide moroides plant. It also has demonstrated anti-mitotic properties, specifically by inhibition of tubulin polymerization. Anti-mitotic activity gives moroidin potential as a chemotherapy drug, and this property combined with its unusual chemical structure has made it a target for organic synthesis.

== Structure ==
Moroidin, a bicyclic octapeptide, has been isolated from Dendrocnide moroides (also called Laportea moroides) and Celosia argentea. The structure of moroidin was confirmed in 2004 by X-ray crystallography. It contains two unusual crosslinks, one between leucine and tryptophan and the other between tryptophan and histidine. These linkages are also present in an analogous family of compounds, the celogentins.

== Total synthesis ==
The total synthesis of moroidin has not yet been described. Partial syntheses including the Leu-Trp and Trp-His linkages have been achieved. In their total synthesis of celogentin C, Castle and coworkers first obtained the Leu-Trp cross-link. The formation of this bond involved an intermolecular Knoevenagel condensation followed by radical conjugate addition and nitro reduction. This gave a product mixture of diastereomers, with the major product having the desired configuration.

A second approach by Jia and coworkers employed an asymmetric Michael addition and bromination, a stereoselective reaction that gave a compound with the correct configuration and Leu-Trp linkage.

Chen and coworkers demonstrated another stereoselective approach, which coupled iodotryptophan to 8-aminoquinoline by palladium catalysis to give a single diastereomer with the desired Leu-Trp linkage and configuration.

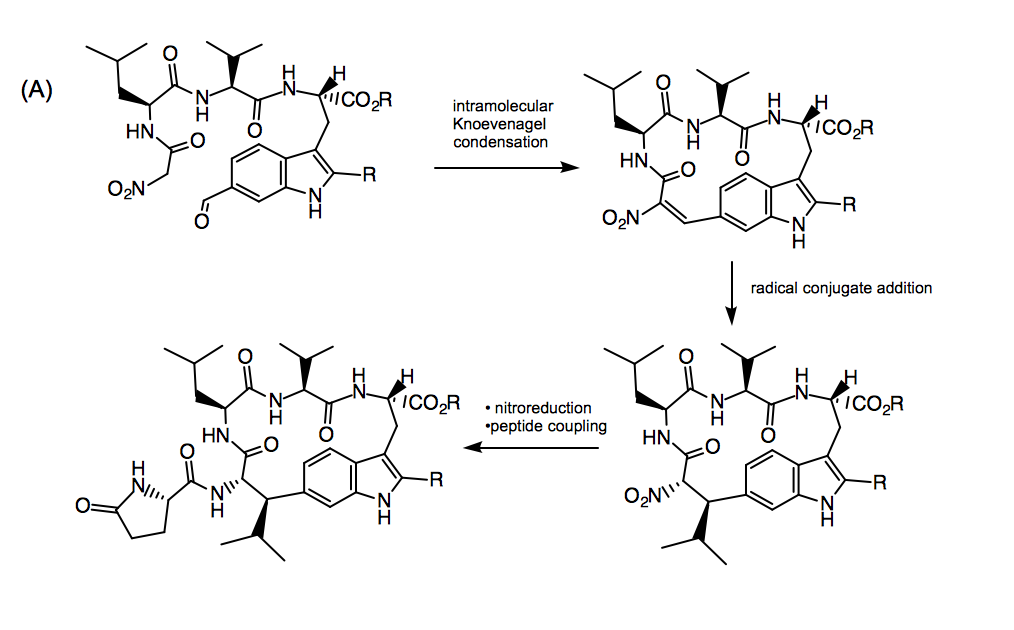
A simplified version of Castle and coworker's partial synthesis of the Leu-Trp crosslink. The linkage is achieved in the second step with radical conjugate addition.

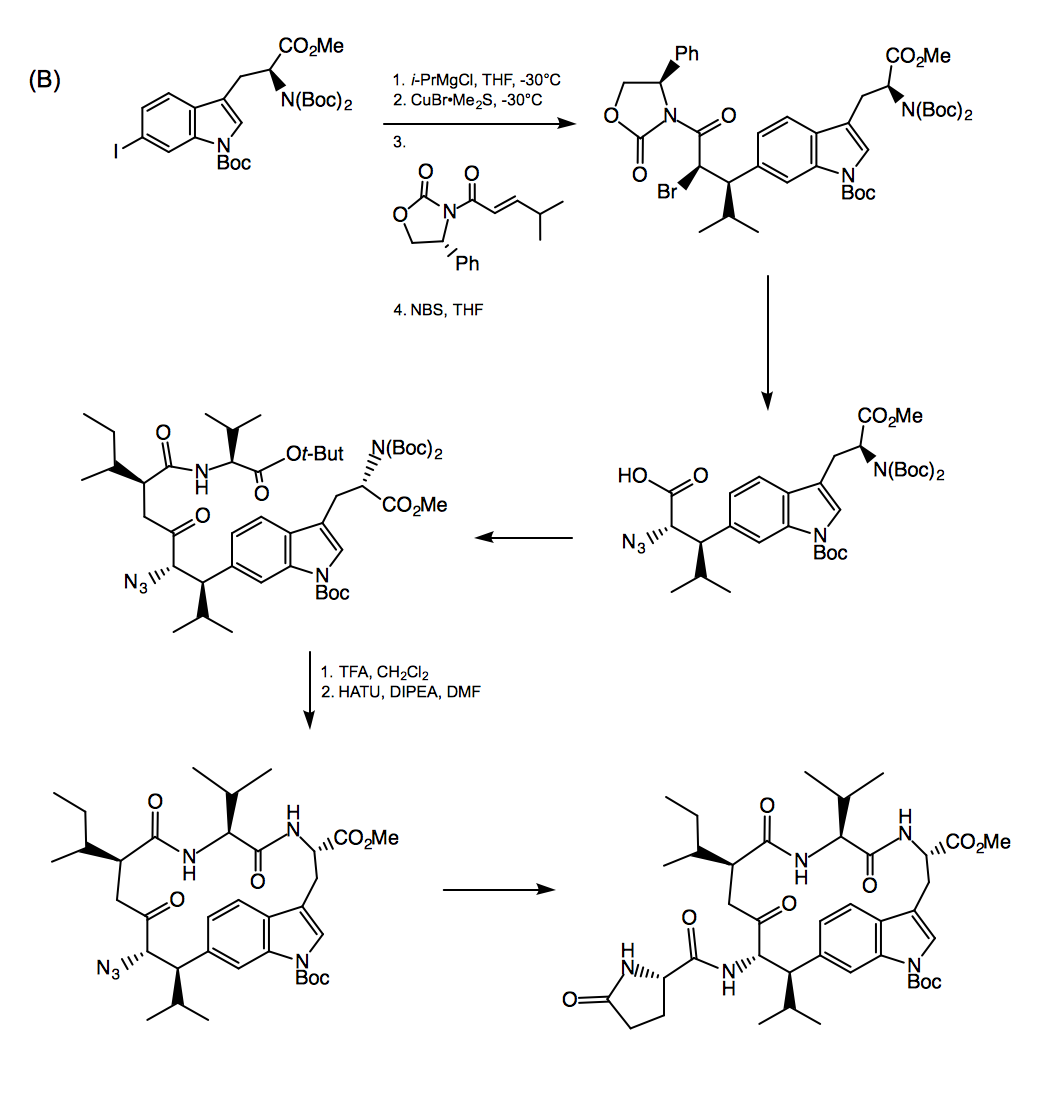
Reaction scheme from Jia and coworkers showing the synthesis of the Leu-Trp crosslink. The first step shows the asymmetric Michael addition that forms the crosslink, followed by bromination that allows substituents to be added in subsequent steps.

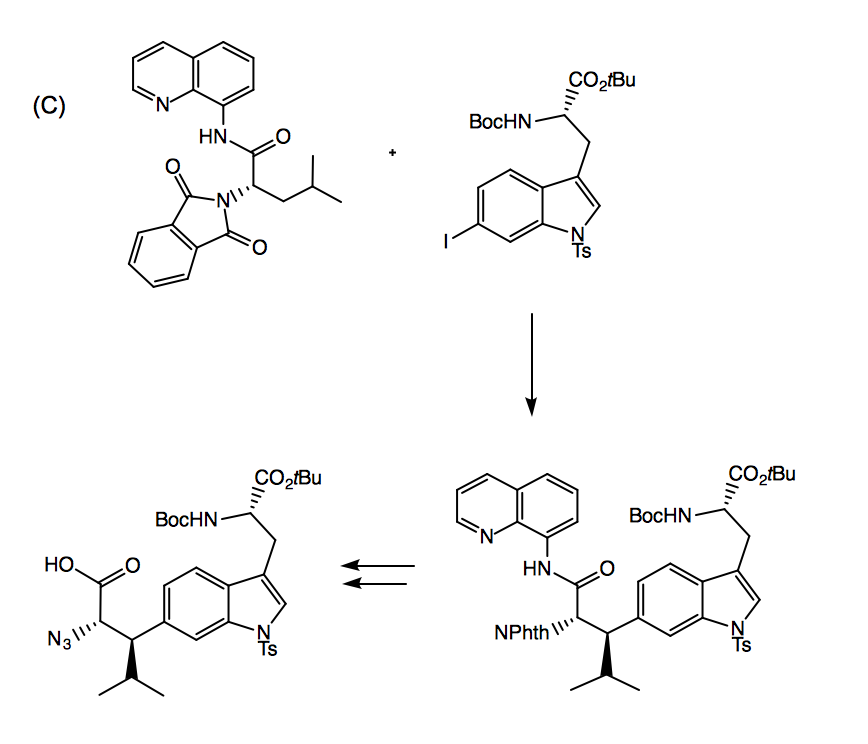
Simplified reaction scheme for the formation of the Leu-Trp crosslink from Chen and coworkers. The link is formed in one step under palladium (II) catalysis.

Examples of synthetic approaches to the Leu-Trp crosslink in the left-hand ring of moroidin.

The Trp-His cross-link is addressed by Castle and coworkers, who used oxidative coupling by NCS to form the C-N linkage. To prevent over-chlorination, NCS was incubated with Pro-OBn, which reacts with NCS so as to modulate its concentration. This method of cross-linking tryptophan and histidine was used in subsequent total synthesis efforts.

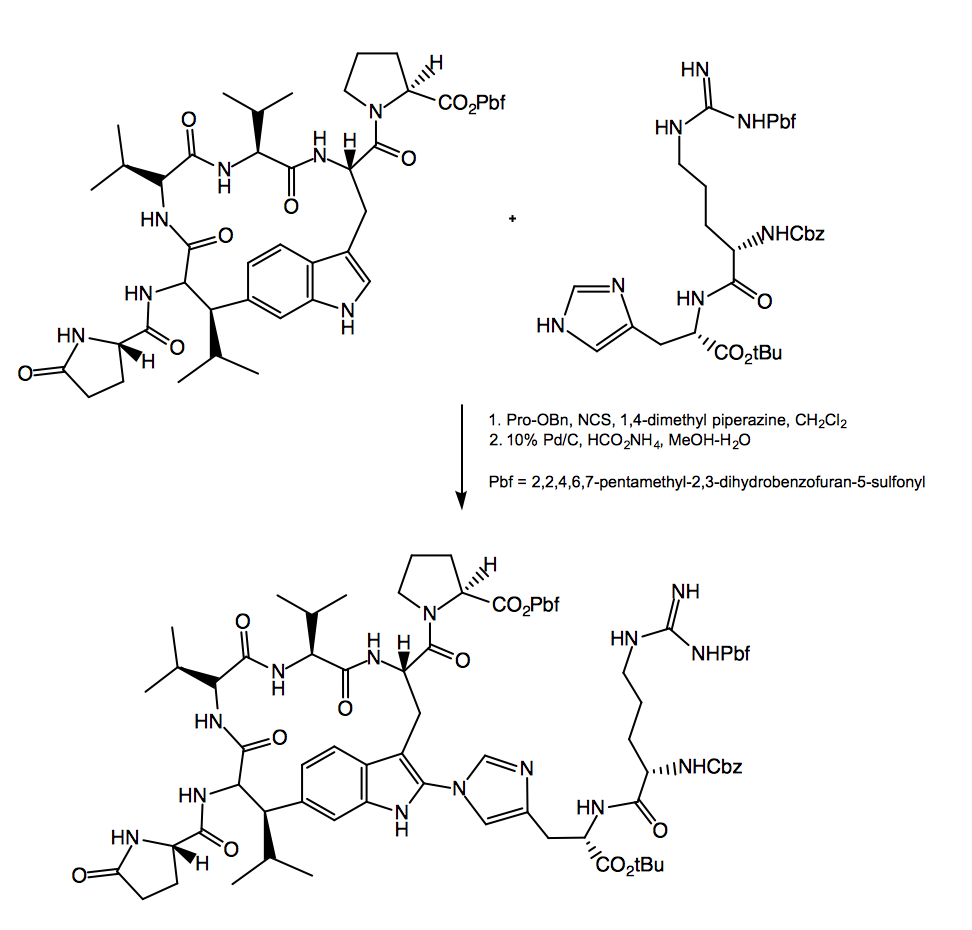
A simplified reaction scheme showing the formation of the Trp-His crosslink, from Castle and coworkers. This oxidative coupling step has been used in several subsequent synthesis attempts.

== Toxicity ==
Moroidin is one of several biologically active compounds isolated from the venom of Dendrocnide moroides, a member of the stinging nettle family. The plant stores its venom in silica hairs that break off when touched, delivering the toxins through the skin and inducing extreme pain. Moroidin also produces a similar pain response when injected subdermally, so it is thought to be partially responsible for the plant’s toxicity. However, moroidin injections are not as potent as injections of crude matter isolated from Dendrocnide moroides, suggesting that there are additional toxins in the plant venom.

Moroidin has shown to have anti-mitotic properties, chiefly by inhibiting the polymerization of tubulin. Tubulin protein polymers are the major component of microtubules. During mitosis, microtubules form the organizing structure called the mitotic apparatus, which captures, aligns, and separates chromosomes. The proper alignment and separation of chromosomes is critical to ensure that cells divide their genetic material equally between daughter cells. Failure to attach chromosomes to the mitotic apparatus activates the mitotic checkpoint, preventing cells from entering anaphase to proceed with cell division. Agents that disrupt microtubules therefore inhibit mitosis through activation of this checkpoint.

Moroidin and its related compounds, the celogentins, inhibit tubulin polymerization. Of this family, celogentin C is the most potent (IC_{50} 0.8×10^{−6} M), and it is more potent than the anti-mitotic agent vinblastine (IC_{50} 3.0×10^{−6} M). Moroidin itself has the same potency as vinblastine. Because of this biological activity, compounds in this family have potential as novel anti-cancer agents.

The mechanism of tubulin disruption is not known, but the degree of biological activity has been linked to the structure of the right-hand ring containing the Trp-His linkage. Moroidin and the celogentins can be divided into three groups according to structural similarity of the right-hand ring. Celogentin C, the most potent compound, has a unique right-hand ring containing a proline residue. Moroidin and its analogous celogentins all have activity comparable to that of vinblastine, and a third group of celogentins all have reduced activity. In contrast, stephanotic acid, a cyclic compound analogous only to the left-hand ring and containing the same Leu-His linkage, has no anti-mitotic activity.

Other anti-tubulin agents used as chemotherapy agents have painful side effects known as neuropathy when the drugs are exposed to tissue. Although the exact mechanism for the cause of neuropathy is unknown, it is thought to be related to the degradation of microtubules, which are essential components of neurons.
