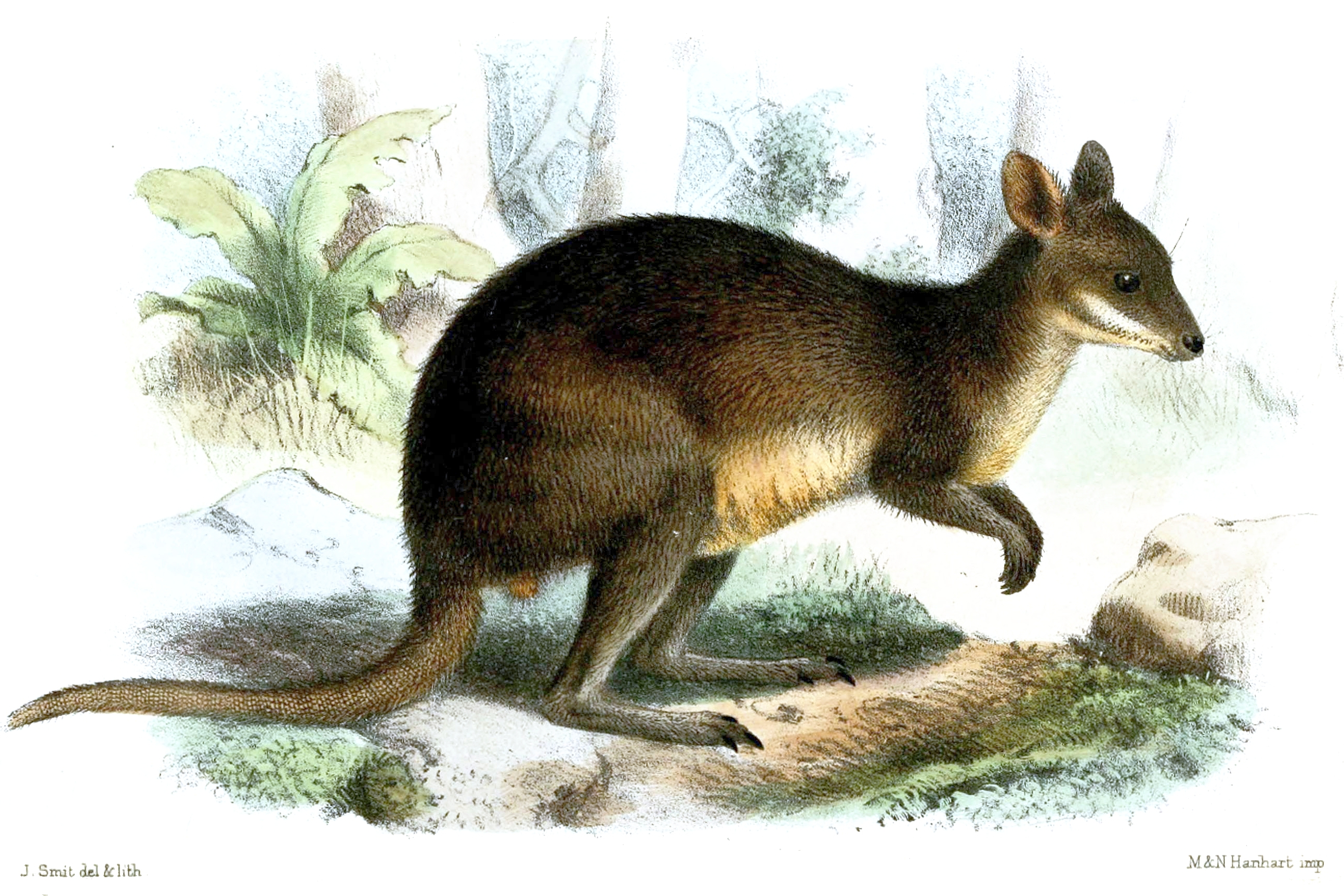

Conservation status
- Vulnerable (IUCN 3.1)

Scientific classification
- Kingdom: Animalia
- Phylum: Chordata
- Class: Mammalia
- Infraclass: Marsupialia
- Order: Diprotodontia
- Family: Macropodidae
- Genus: Thylogale
- Species: T. browni

Binomial name
- Thylogale browni (Ramsay, 1877)
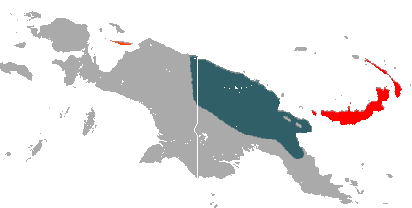
- Brown's pademelon range (blue — native, red — introduced, orange — possibly extinct)

= Brown's pademelon =

Species of marsupial

Brown's pademelon (Thylogale browni) is a species of marsupial in the family Macropodidae. It is found in New Guinea. Its natural habitats are subtropical or tropical dry forests, dry savanna, subtropical or tropical dry shrubland, and subtropical or tropical dry lowland grassland. It is threatened by habitat loss.
