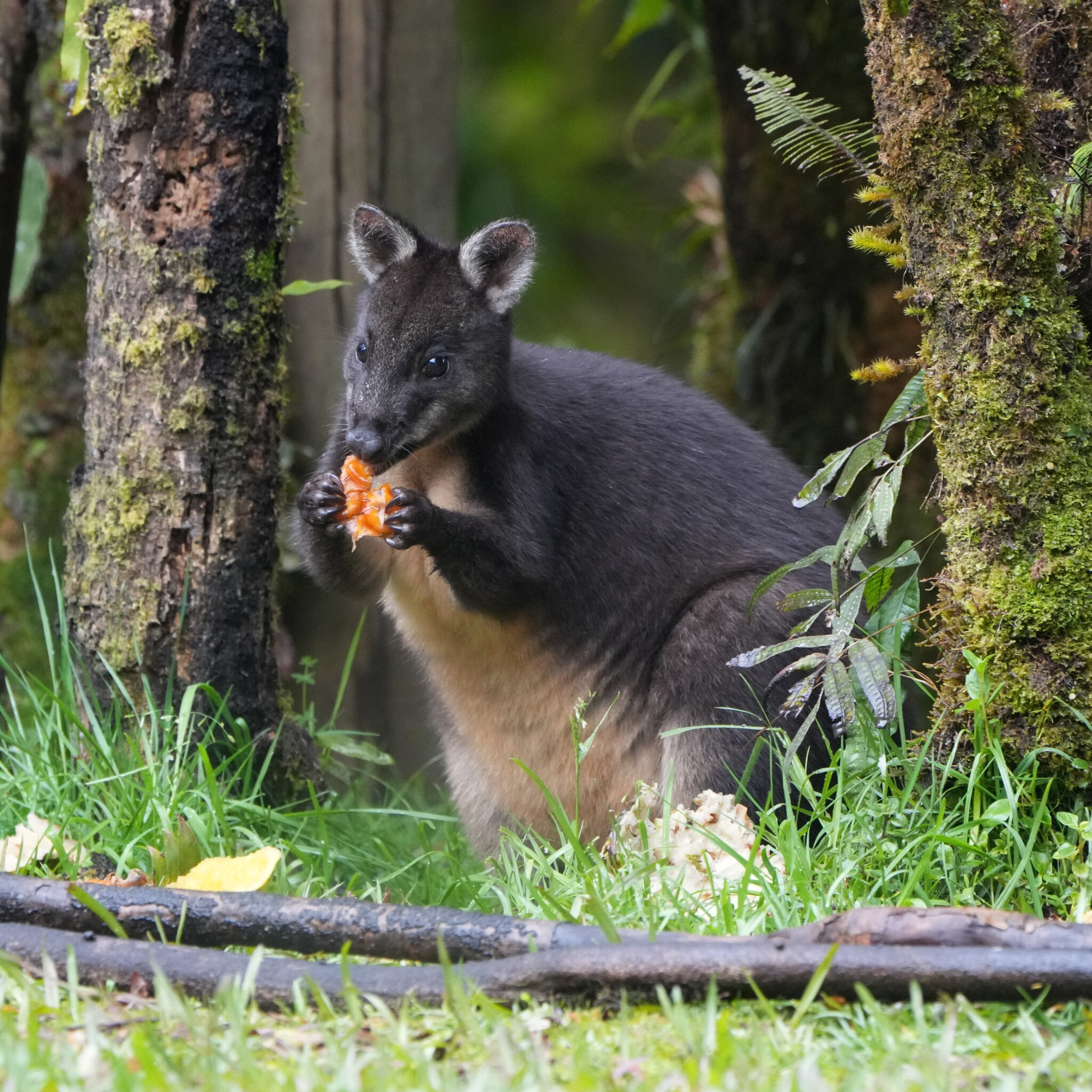

Conservation status
- Endangered (IUCN 3.1)

Scientific classification
- Kingdom: Animalia
- Phylum: Chordata
- Class: Mammalia
- Infraclass: Marsupialia
- Order: Diprotodontia
- Family: Macropodidae
- Genus: Thylogale
- Species: T. calabyi

Binomial name
- Thylogale calabyi Flannery, 1992
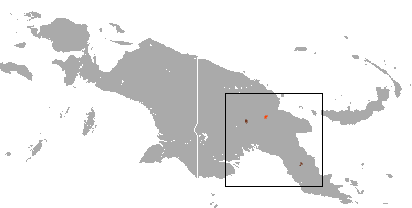
- Calaby's pademelon range (brown — extant, orange — possibly extinct)

= Calaby's pademelon =

Species of marsupial

Calaby's pademelon (Thylogale calabyi), also known as the alpine wallaby, is a species of marsupial in the family Macropodidae. It is endemic to Papua New Guinea. It is threatened by habitat loss and hunting.

Pademelons share many similarities in body structure to other marsupials through their pouch to care for their young and tail used for jumping. Calaby's Pademelon prefers to forage in dense forested overgrowth and feeds on native leaves and grasses. The life span for this animal is up to 6 years in the wild. This species is considered iteroparous with the gestation period spanning 30 days. After birth, young stay in the mothers pouch for approximately 6 months. They are considered sexually mature at 14–15 months. There are many pademelon species, but Calaby's pademelon is considered one of the most endangered due to its poorly distributed population from habitat loss. This species is classified as endangered by the IUCN. The arrival of human populations have been largely responsible for Calaby's Pademelon's dwindling population. Humans continue to be a threat to this species through hunting practices and deforestation. Conservation efforts have been created to help preserve the remaining populations left. Papua New Guinea has established the YUS Conservation Area. The reserve is an acronym named after three major rivers that run through it, the Yopno, Uruwa, and Som of the Huon Peninsula and works to conserve Calaby's Pademelon. However, more research regarding population size, distribution, and trends of this species in Papua New Guinea is needed to better understand population dynamics of Calaby's Pademelon.

== Description and range ==
Pademelons are small marsupials of the genus Thylogale. Pademelons are some of the smallest of the family Macropodidae. The word 'macropod' means 'big foot' which is a common trait found in marsupials. Most Macropods share the characteristics of hind legs larger than their forelimbs, large hind feet, and long muscular tails used for balance. Pademelons, wallabies, and kangaroos are very alike in body structure and originate from the same taxonomic family. Besides their smaller size, pademelons can be distinguished from wallabies by their shorter, thicker, and sparsely haired tails and ambulate by hopping just like wallabies. Male Pademelons grow to about 7 kg (15 lbs) which is roughly twice the size of their female counterpart which grow to about 4 kg (8 lbs). The length of the pademelon is 1 to 1.5 m (3.28 to 4.92 ft). Males are distinguishable by their defined muscles and body size due to their broad chest and forearms. Pademelons are characterised by their bilateral symmetry and are endothermic. Calaby's pademelon has soft fine fur that is dark brown to grey brown on the dorsal side of the animal and reddish brown or lighter brown on the ventral side. Calaby's pademelon currently has an area of occupancy of less than 500 km^{2} and is classified as 'endangered' by the IUCN.

== Ecology ==
The natural habitat of the pademelon is in dense forested undergrowth. They also make tunnels through long grasses and bushes in swampy areas. Pademelons are generally solitary animals and are the most active during the winter season. In winter, pademelons may gather in groups at feeding sites or basking sites. Pademelons are most active in late afternoon through to dawn. During the day, they rest in shallow depressions that are constructed nests lined with dead vegetation, shell fragments, feathers, and small pebbles. These marsupials thrive in dense eucalyptus forests and tend to live on the edge of the forest habitat. They stay particularly close to the forest edge when foraging at night. Each species differ slightly on what they feed on. T. calabyi (Calaby's pademelon) feeds on fallen leaves, fresh leaves, ferns, orchids, grasses and berries. Their short tail and compact body are useful for maneuvering through dense vegetation. The pademelon breeding period is throughout the year. The gestation period for the female is 30 days while the 'joey' stays in the pouch for sixth and a half months after birth. The young are weaned from the mother around 7 or 8 months. Immediately after birth, the mother goes into oestrus and mates again. The lifespan of the Calaby Pademelon is around 5 to 6 years in the wild. They are considered sexually mature at 14–15 months. Pademelon predators are Tasmanian wolves (Thylacinus cynocephalus), Tasmanian devils (Sarcophilus harrisii), spotted tailed quolls (Dasyurus maculatus) and wedge-tailed eagles (Aquila audax).

== Conservation threats to habitat ==
The arrival of Aboriginal people between 40,000 and 60,000 years ago was the first major threat to the Pademelon. These people started hunting the marsupials for meat and fur trade and frequently burned habitat vegetation. However, the arrival of European settlers had the greatest effect on native populations and drove out the Pademelon from the Australian mainland through the introduction of European livestock and bushfire patterns.

Pademelon meat used to be considered valuable and was eaten by settlers and Aboriginal people. Aside from being killed for their meat and soft fur, their numbers have been reduced by the introduction of predators such as feral cats, dogs, and foxes. The clearing of land for homes has pushed the larger wallabies and predators into land that pademelons had been thriving in for so long. Despite these predators, many pademelons reside in Tasmania and its outlying smaller islands. Habitat loss is high from deforestation initiatives. Human activities that have impacted the pademelon populations include roadkill, loss of natural habitats from clearing for management, agricultural purposes, and urban development. Habitat loss leaves pademelons to vacate to shrublands to feast on lush plants and leaves them exposed to predators. Climate change and severe weather is altering and shifting habitat range leaving pademelons exposed in grasslands as forests are reduced.

== Use and trade ==
Calaby Pademelons are being exploited for commercial benefit. Their flesh is sold for meat and fur is used and exported for international fur trade. These marsupials are hunted and trapped for commercial, recreational, or crop protection purposes. Mostly males are shot since they are bigger and an easier target thus impacting population dynamics in gender balance and genetic diversity. The Pademelon industry is worth a total of $750,000 in Oceania. Many indigenous Papua New Guinean people value Calaby's Pademelon for its fur and meat.

== Conservation actions in place ==
Calaby's pademelon is one of the most threatened Pademelon species. The IUCN lists Thylogale calaby's status as endangered from its June 15, 2015 assessment. The species is now restricted to Mts. Albert Edward and Giluwe, being confined to alpine grasslands. It is listed as endangered because it has an area of occupancy of less than 500 km^{2} with all individuals in fewer than five locations. There is a continued decline in the extent and quality of its habitat due to predators as well as the number of mature individuals due to hunting. Calaby's Pademelon is currently only found in two locations in Papua New Guinea which are suspected to be the two remaining subpopulations of relicts of what was once a more widely distributed species. Calaby's Pademelon was only a recently discovered pademelon species. In 2009, the Papua New Guinea government created its first national conservation area owned by 35 surrounding indigenous villages that have agreed to prohibit hunting, logging, mining, and other development within the park area. 12 years was spent to establish the YUS Conservation Area. The reserve is an acronym named after three major rivers that run through it, the Yopno, Uruwa, and Som of the Huon Peninsula. The establishment of parks and nature reserves plays an important role in conservation efforts for these endangered species. More hunting regulations must be implemented to protect this endangered species. Calaby's Pademelon is currently not protected under the CITES Legislation.

== Conservation / research needed ==
Although pademelons are widespread and common in coastal eastern Australia, Tasmania, and surrounding islands, they have been largely neglected in population genetic studies. More research is being conducted on the genetic structuring of the widespread endemic Calaby's Pademelon based on current taxonomy, zoogeography, and preliminary genetic findings are investigated using mitochondrial DNA sequence data. This data will help determine best management strategies for separate populations of the species. Calaby's pademelon has by far the least known information out of the 7 known pademelon species. More research is needed on the population size, distribution, and trends of this species in Papua New Guinea. Research is also being conducted to understand individualistic responses to historic climate change in order to adequately conserve genetic diversity and the evolutionary potential of species.
