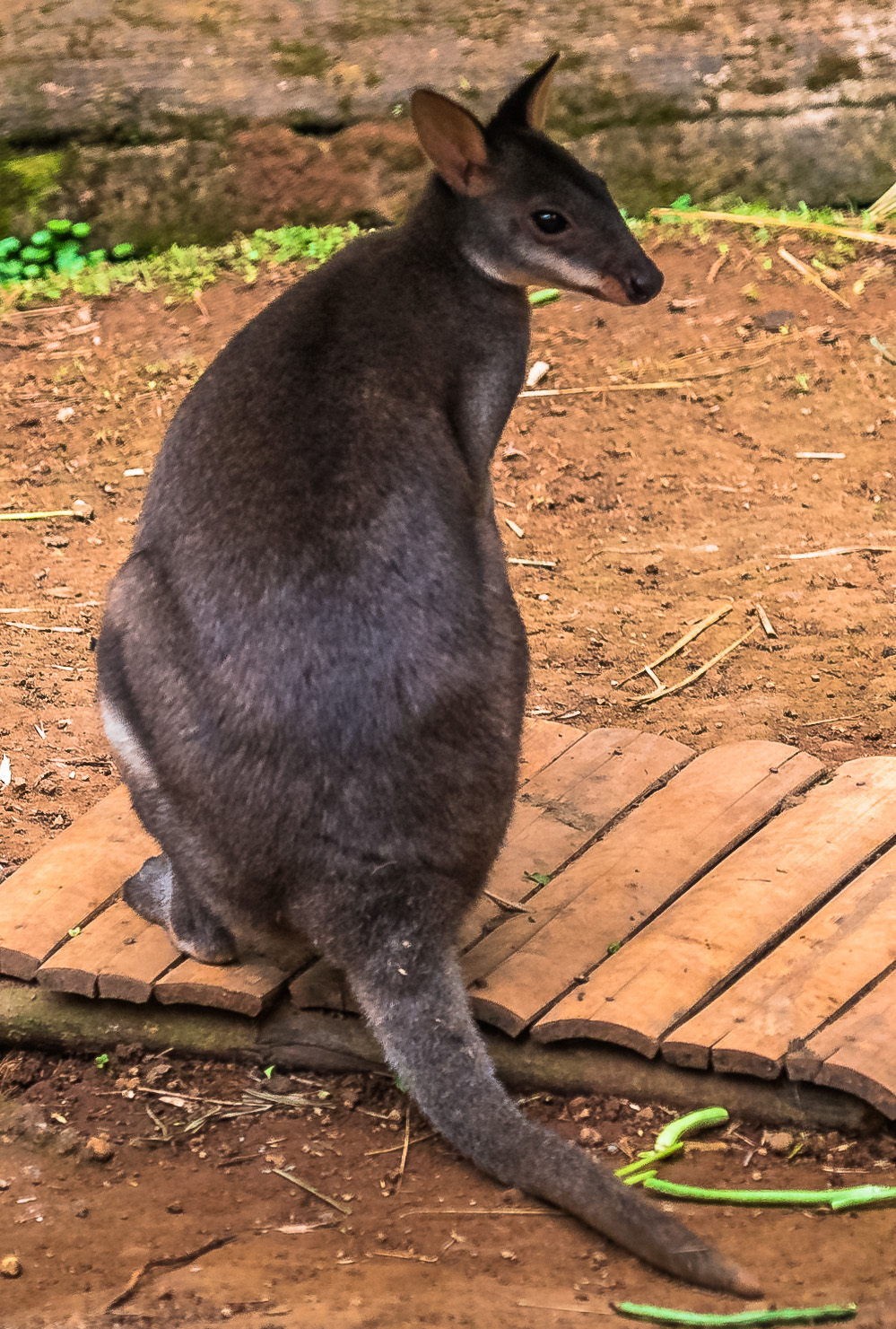
- Dusky pademelon in Taman Safari Bogor

Conservation status
- Vulnerable (IUCN 3.1)

Scientific classification
- Kingdom: Animalia
- Phylum: Chordata
- Class: Mammalia
- Infraclass: Marsupialia
- Order: Diprotodontia
- Family: Macropodidae
- Genus: Thylogale
- Species: T. brunii

Binomial name
- Thylogale brunii (Schreber, 1778)
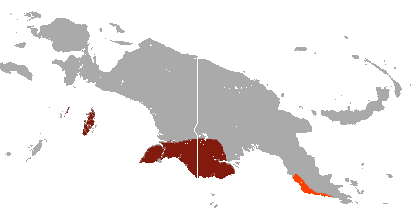
- Dusky Pademelon range (brown — extant, orange — possibly extinct)

= Dusky pademelon =

Species of marsupial

The dusky pademelon or dusky wallaby (Thylogale brunii) is a species of marsupial in the family Macropodidae. It is found in the Aru and Kai islands and the Trans-Fly savanna and grasslands ecoregion of New Guinea. Its natural habitats are subtropical or tropical dry forests, dry savanna, subtropical or tropical dry shrubland, and subtropical or tropical dry lowland grassland. It is threatened by habitat loss.

== Names ==
The scientific name of this pademelon honors Cornelis de Bruijn, the Dutch painter who first described it in the second volume of his Travels, originally published in 1711. There de Bruijn labeled his description with a common name then current, philander ("friend of man"). A later common name was the Aru Island wallaby.

It is known as kutwal (or kotwal) in the Kalam language of Papua New Guinea. François Valentyn records that Aru Islanders call it aijir and pelandoe; the Malays call it pelandok-aru ("Aru mousedeer") while the Ambonese call it koeskoes-aroe ("Aru cuscus") because it has a pouch like said animal.
