= Prorodes leucothyralis =

Scientific classification
- Kingdom: Animalia
- Phylum: Arthropoda
- Clade: Pancrustacea
- Class: Insecta
- Order: Lepidoptera
- Family: Crambidae
- Genus: Prorodes
- Species: P. leucothyralis

Binomial name
- Prorodes leucothyralis Mabille, 1900

Synonyms
- Coptobasoides leucothyralis

Species of moth

Prorodes leucothyralis is a moth in the family Crambidae. It was described by Paul Mabille in 1900. It is found on Madagascar.
