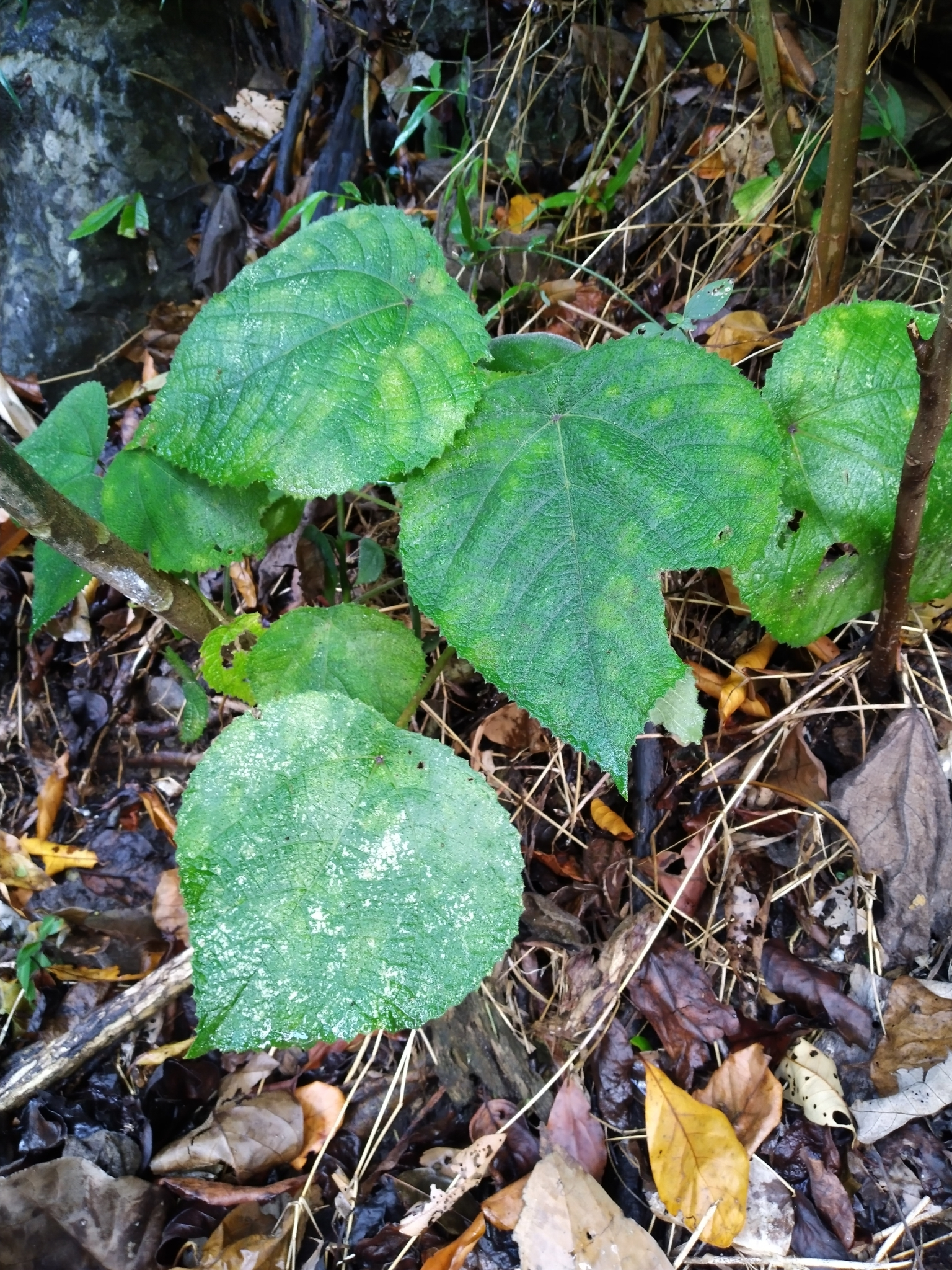
- Young plant

Conservation status
- Least Concern (IUCN 3.1)

Scientific classification
- Kingdom: Plantae
- Clade: Tracheophytes
- Clade: Angiosperms
- Clade: Eudicots
- Clade: Rosids
- Order: Rosales
- Family: Urticaceae
- Genus: Dendrocnide
- Species: D. moroides

Binomial name
- Dendrocnide moroides (Wedd.) Chew
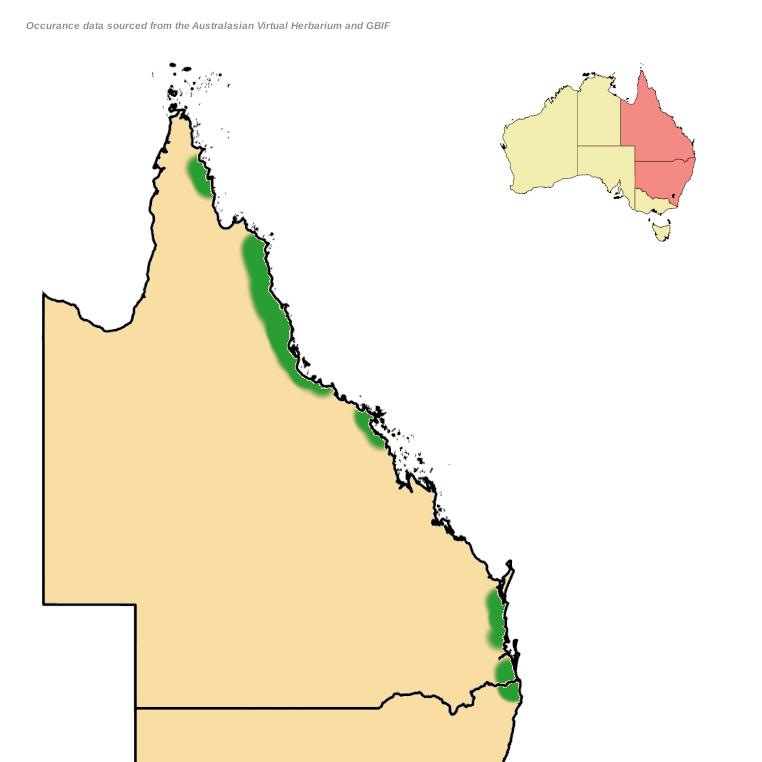
- Dendrocnide moroides distribution in Australia

Synonyms
- Laportea moroides Wedd.; Urtica moroides A.Cunn. ex Wedd.; Urticastrum moroides (Wedd.) Kuntze

= Dendrocnide moroides =

Gympie-gympie

Species of plant in the nettle family

Dendrocnide moroides, commonly known in Australia as the stinging tree, stinging bush, or gympie-gympie, and also sometimes referred to as the suicide plant, is a plant in the nettle family Urticaceae found in rainforest areas of Queensland and New South Wales in Australia. It is notorious for its extremely painful and long-lasting sting. The common name gympie-gympie comes from the language of the indigenous Gubbi Gubbi people of south-eastern Queensland.

== Description ==
D. moroides is a straggly perennial shrub, usually flowering and fruiting when less than 3 m (10 ft) tall, but it may reach up to 10 m (33 ft) in height. It is superficially similar to Dendrocnide cordifolia, with the most obvious difference being the point of attachment of the petiole to the leaf blade—where D. moroides is peltate, i.e. the stalk attaches to the underside of the leaf and not at the edge, D. cordifolia is cordate. The stem, branches, petioles, leaves, and fruits are all covered in stinging hairs.

It has large, heart-shaped simple leaves about 12–22 cm (4 1/2–8 1/2 in) long and 11–18 cm (4 1/2–7 in) wide with toothed margins, a pointed tip and a cordate to obtuse base shape. There are six to eight pairs of lateral veins on either side of the midrib. The petiole (leaf stem) is quite long, about as long as the leaf blade itself, with stipules about 1–2 cm (1/2–3/4 in) long.

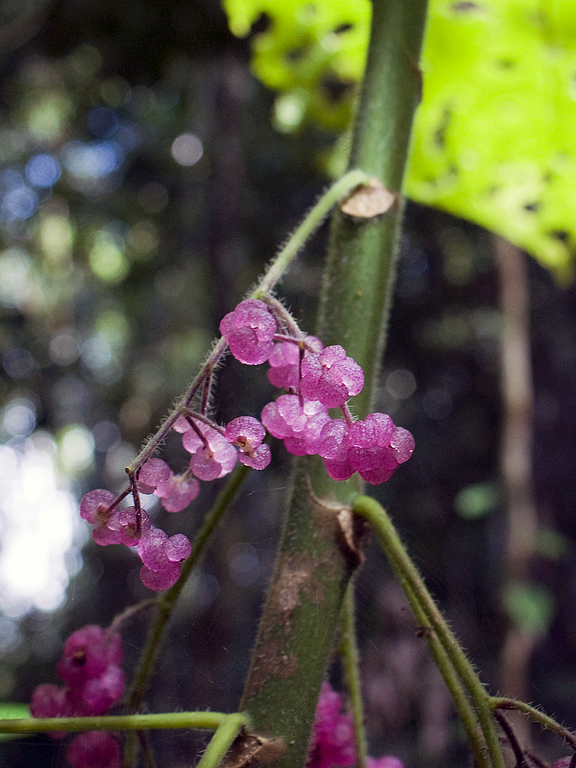
Fruit

The inflorescence is monoecious (rarely dioecious), and is borne in the leaf axils. It is up to 15 cm (6 in) long, often paired. It carries both male and female flowers which are quite small, the perianth measuring less than 1 mm (0.04 in) across. Flowering occurs throughout the year, but mostly in summer.

The fruit of this species is an achene (a tiny seed-like fruit), produced in number in a globular structure which is pink to light-purple in colour and has an appearance similar to a mulberry. Each achene, measuring just 2 mm (0.08 in) long, is contained in a small fleshy sac which derives from the swollen pedicel. As with the rest of this plant, the infructescences are also covered in stinging hairs, but are edible if the hairs are removed.

== Taxonomy ==
The type specimen for this species was collected in 1819 by Allan Cunningham near the Endeavour River, and was first described in 1857 by Hugh Algernon Weddell as Laportea moroides in his work Monographie de la Famille des Urticées, published in the journal Archives du Muséum d'Histoire Naturelle. The current binomial combination was published by Wee-Lek Chew in The Gardens' Bulletin Singapore in 1966.

=== Etymology ===
The genus name Dendrocnide has been constructed on the Ancient Greek δένδρον déndron 'tree', and κνίδος knídos 'stinging needle'. The species epithet moroides is created from the genus name for mulberries Morus, combined with the Greek suffix -oides 'resembling', referring to the mulberry-like infructescence. The binomial name may be translated as "mulberry-like stinging tree".

== Distribution ==
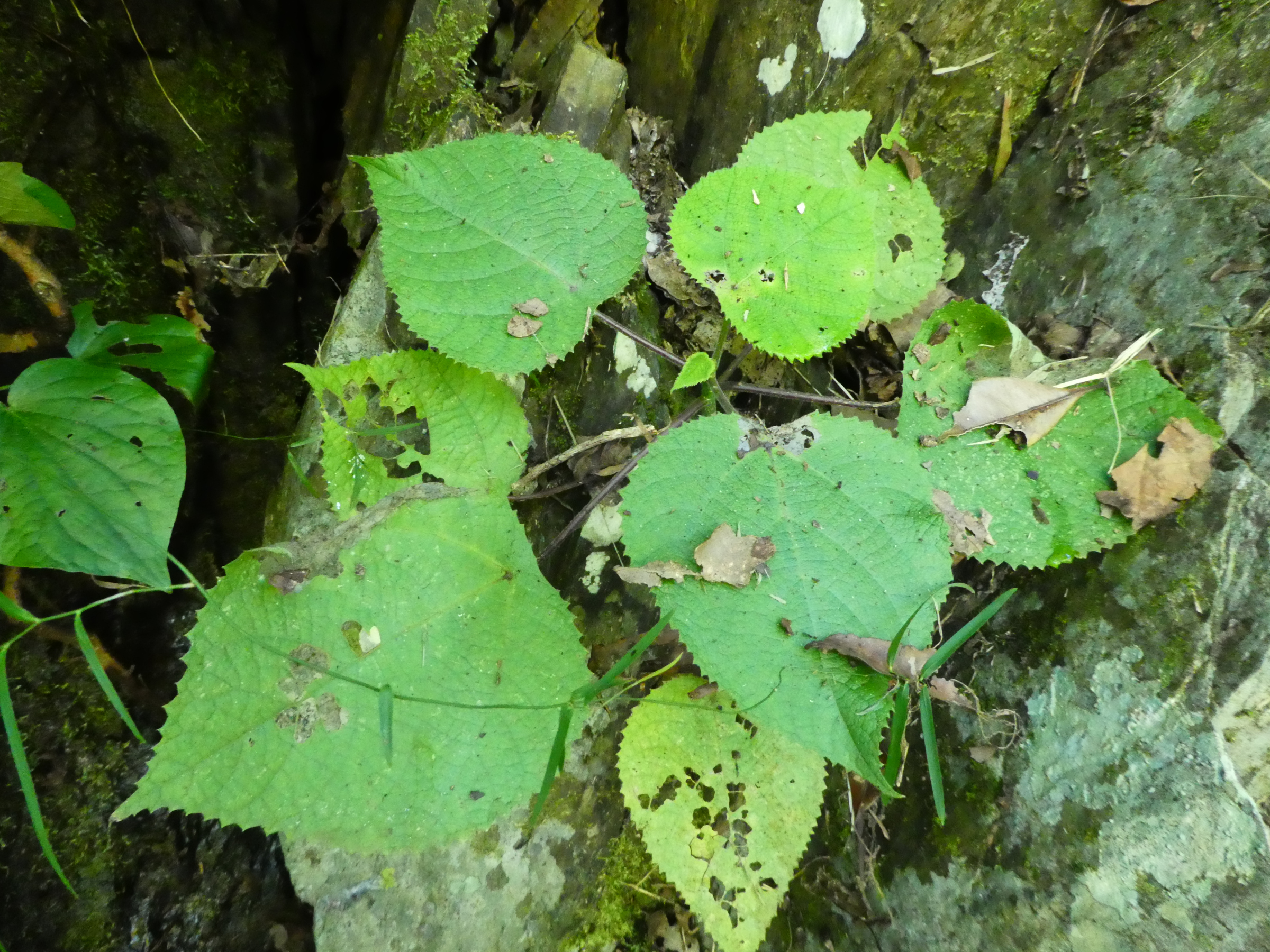
Small plant at Crystal Cascades near Cairns, Queensland, June 2021

The species occurs in and near rainforest from the top of Cape York Peninsula south along the east coast to northern New South Wales; it is common in north Queensland but rare in New South Wales, where it is listed as an endangered species. It has also been recorded from the eastern part of East Timor, and from the island of Yamdena in the Tanimbar Islands.

The Australasian Virtual Herbarium has two records of collections of this species from northeast Papua New Guinea, both of which have an original identification of "Laportea peltata Gaudich." and an interpreted identification of "Dendrocnide moroides". They are described as being 12.2 m tall for one, and 21.3 m tall for the other. Laportea peltata Gaudich. ex Decne. is a synonym of Dendrocnide morobensis.

== Habitat ==
It is an early coloniser in rainforest gaps, such as alongside water courses and roads, around tree falls, and in man-made clearings. The seeds germinate in full sunlight after soil disturbance. Although common in Queensland, it is rare in the southernmost part of its range and is listed as an endangered species in New South Wales.

== Ecology ==
Dendrocnide moroides serves as the host plant for larvae of the white nymph butterfly. A variety of insects feed on the leaves, among them the nocturnal beetle Prasyptera mastersi and the moth Prorodes mimica, as well as the herbivorous red-legged pademelon, which is unique among mammals in being apparently immune to the plant's neurotoxins. Fruits are eaten by various birds that distribute the seeds in their droppings.

== Conservation status ==
As of August 2026, this species has been given the conservation status of least concern by the International Union for Conservation of Nature (IUCN) and by the Queensland Government under its Nature Conservation Act. In New South Wales the species is considered to be endangered.

In its statement, the IUCN acknowledges that there is an ongoing decline in suitable habitat for this species and that localised populations may be at threat from development, but that these factors are balanced by the broad extent of the species as a whole as well as the fact that it occurs in a number of protected areas.

The New South Wales Government assessment states that the plant is very rare in that state, and threats include low population numbers, fragmentation of habitat, pressure from invasive weeds, and landholders removing the species from their properties.

The Queensland Wildnet database does not provide any explanation for its conservation assessments.

== Toxicity ==
D. moroides is notorious for its extremely painful sting which may leave victims suffering for weeks or even months. It is reputed to be the most venomous plant in Australia, if not the world. After contact with the plant the victim will feel an immediate severe burning and stinging at the site of contact, which then intensifies further over the next 20 to 30 minutes and will last from hours to several days before subsiding. During this time the victim may get little sleep because of the intensity of the pain. In severe cases, it may cause hives, and the lymph glands under the arms may swell and become painful. There have been rare cases of hospitalization.

=== Mechanism ===
Trichome of the stinging nettle Urtica dioica, similar in basic design to those of D. moroides

Very fine, brittle hairs called trichomes are loaded with toxins and cover the entire plant; even the slightest touch will embed them in the skin. Electron micrograph images show that they are similar to a hypodermic needle in being very sharp-pointed and hollow. Additionally, it has been shown that there is a structurally weak point near the tip of the hair, which acts as a pre-set fracture line. When it enters the skin the hair fractures at this point, allowing the contents of the trichome to be injected into the victim's tissues.

The trichomes stay in the skin for up to a year, and release the toxin cocktail into the body during triggering events such as touching the affected area, contact with water, or temperature changes. Ernie Rider, a conservation officer with the Queensland Parks and Wildlife Service, was slapped in the face and torso with the foliage in 1963, and said:

For two or three days the pain was almost unbearable; I couldn't work or sleep... I remember it feeling like there were giant hands trying to squash my chest... then it was pretty bad pain for another fortnight or so. The stinging persisted for two years and recurred every time I had a cold shower...There's nothing to rival it; it's ten times worse than anything else.

Physical contact with Dendrocnide moroides is not the only way that it can cause harm to a person—the trichomes are constantly being shed from the plant and may be suspended in the air within its vicinity. They can then be inhaled, which may lead to respiratory complications if a person spends time in close proximity to the plant. The Australian entomologist and ecologist Marina Hurley wrote her doctorate studying two Dendrocnide species of the Atherton Tablelands, west of Cairns, namely Dendrocnide moroides and Dendrocnide cordifolia, and was exposed to the airborne hairs over a long period of time. She suffered sneezing fits, watery eyes and nose, and eventually developed an allergy that required medical attention. W. V. MacFarlane, who was a Professorial Fellow in Physiology at the John Curtin School of Medical Research at the Australian National University, observed the effects of inhaling the trichomes, and he reported:

The plucking of hairs from the leaves invariably produces sneezing in the operator within 10 or 15 minutes. During early attempts to separate stinging hairs from dried leaves, dust and presumably some hairs were inhaled. Initially they produced sneezing, but within three hours there was diffuse nasopharyngeal pain, and after 26 hours a sensation of an acute sore throat like tonsillitis was experienced.

=== Pharmacology ===
The cause of the intense pain has been the subject of scientific research since European explorers first encountered the plant in the mid-19th century. While it is known that a cocktail of toxins is contained within the trichomes, its exact nature was not fully understood as of 2018. It is known that the active constituents are very stable, since dead leaves found on the forest floor and even decades-old laboratory specimens can still inflict the sting.

Early studies suggested that a variety of compounds, such as histamine, acetylcholine, 5-hydroxytryptamine and formic acid, could be responsible; however, none of these has been proven to produce a similar intensity or duration of pain to those exhibited by the sting from the plant. Around 1970 a new compound was identified and given the name moroidin. It was for a time thought possibly to be the causative agent; however, later research showed that it did not cause the same effects as a sting from the plant.

In 2020 a previously unknown family of disulfide-rich peptides was identified by a group of researchers and given the name gympietides. These compounds were shown to be similar to some toxins found in cone snails, and produce significant pain responses in laboratory tests. Moreover, their complex structure – resembling the inhibitor cystine knot – made them highly stable, explaining how the sting lasts for such a long time.

There has been anecdotal evidence of some plants having no sting but still possessing the hairs, suggesting a chemical change to the toxin.

=== Remedies ===
A commonly recommended first-aid treatment is to use depilatory wax or sticky tape to remove the hairs. The Kuku Yalanji people of Mossman Gorge used a method that was essentially similar, making a juice from the fruits or roots of the plant and applying it to the affected area, before scraping it off with a mussel shell once it had become sticky. Mechanical removal is not always successful however, as the hairs are so tiny that the skin will often close over them, making removal impossible.

Various other treatments, mostly ineffectual, have been tried over time. They include bathing the affected area in hot water, applying papaya ointment, xylocaine or lignocaine cream, and even swabbing with dilute hydrochloric acid. All of these have, at best, a temporary effect.

== Anecdotal stories ==
Anecdotes of encounters with gympie-gympie are numerous, and range in accuracy, such as one which involves using the leaves as toilet paper (the user would have been stung when they first picked up the leaf, and unlikely to have proceeded to use it in the intended manner). Nevertheless, some have been documented, such as horses having to be rested after being stung, or even becoming violent and having to be shot. Only one report of a human fatality attributed to any Dendrocnide species (in this case D. cordata) is confirmed, which occurred in New Guinea in 1922.

== Gallery ==
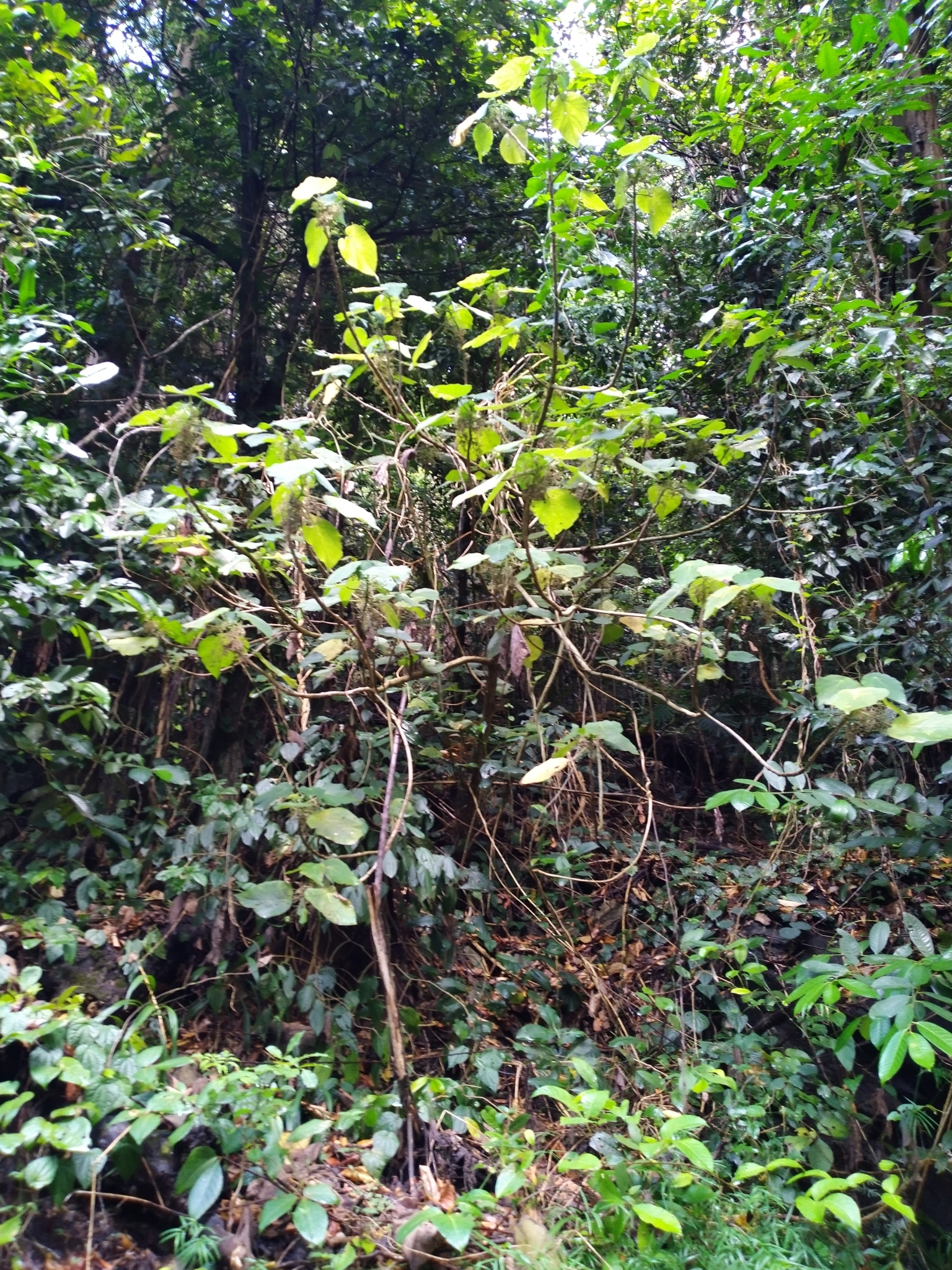
Mature shrub around 3 metres tall

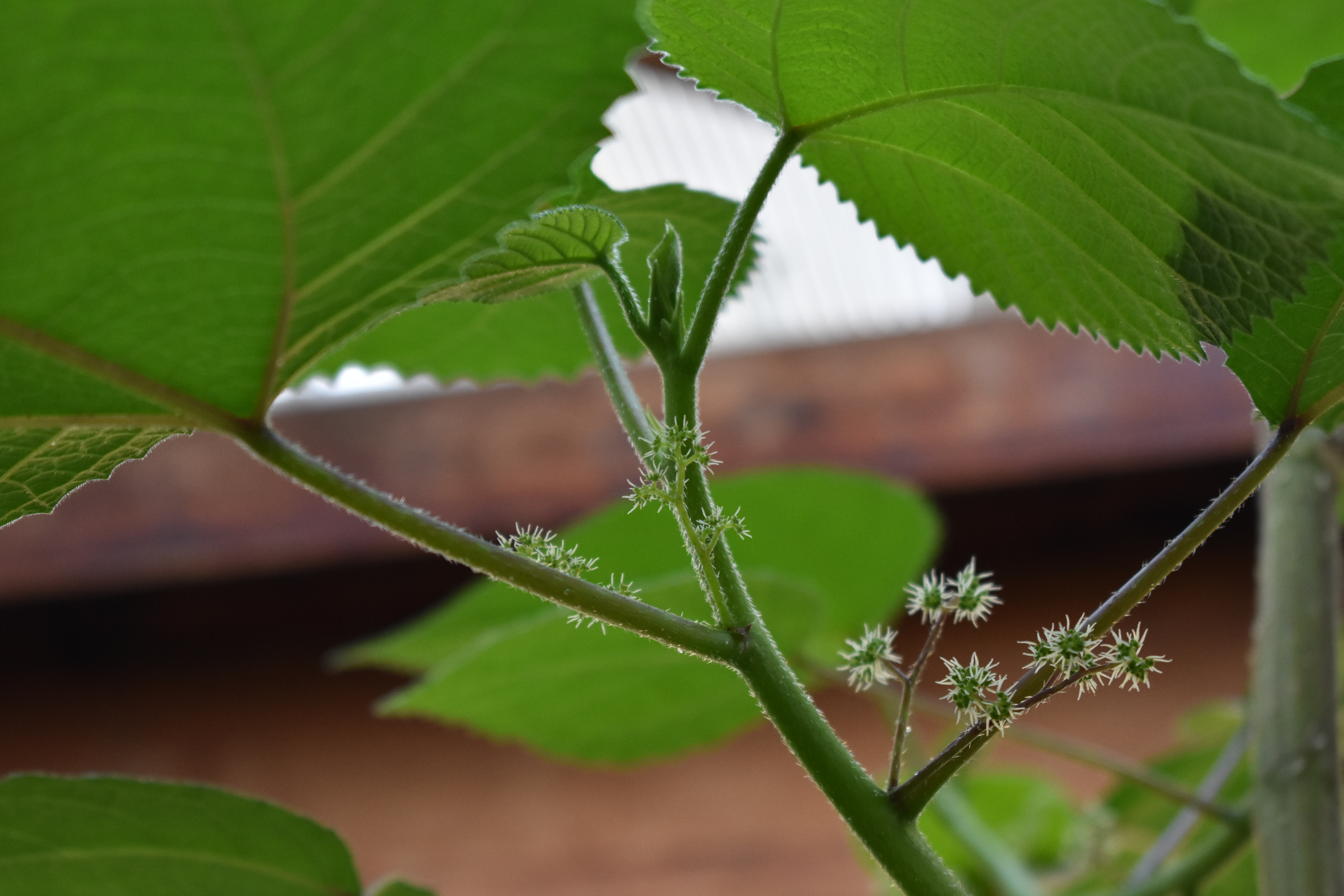
Inflorescence

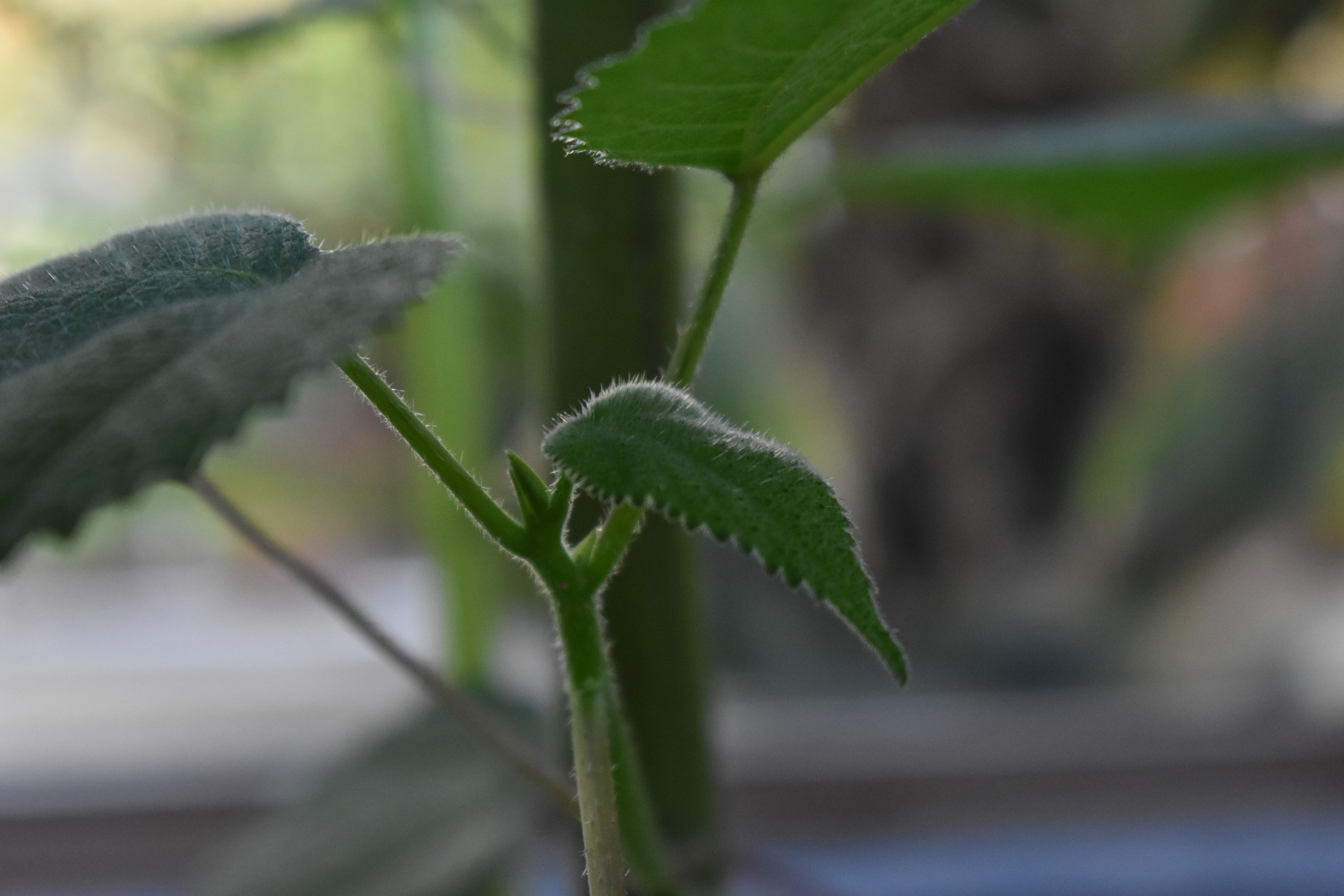
Detail showing stinging hairs

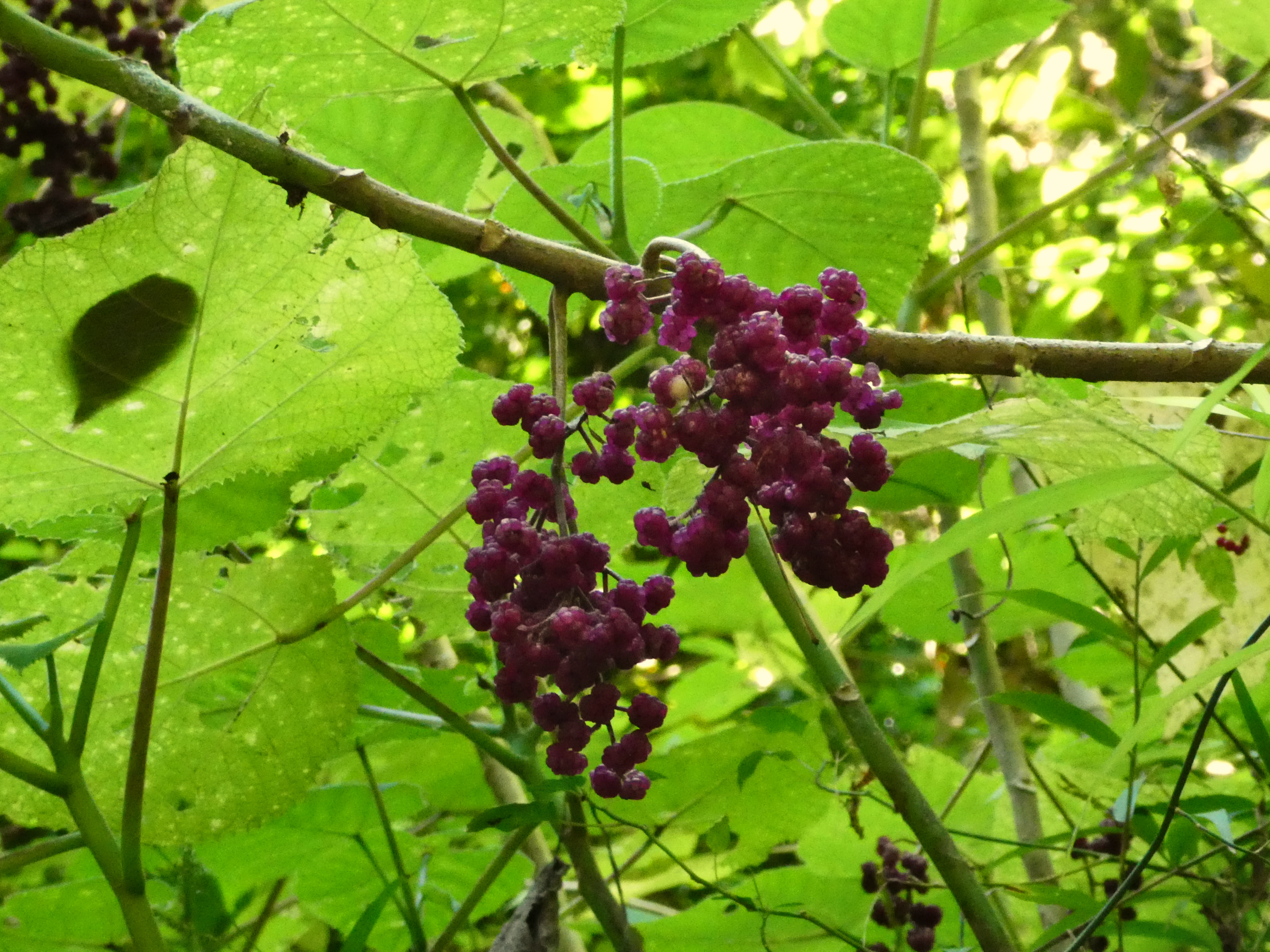
Fruits and leaves
