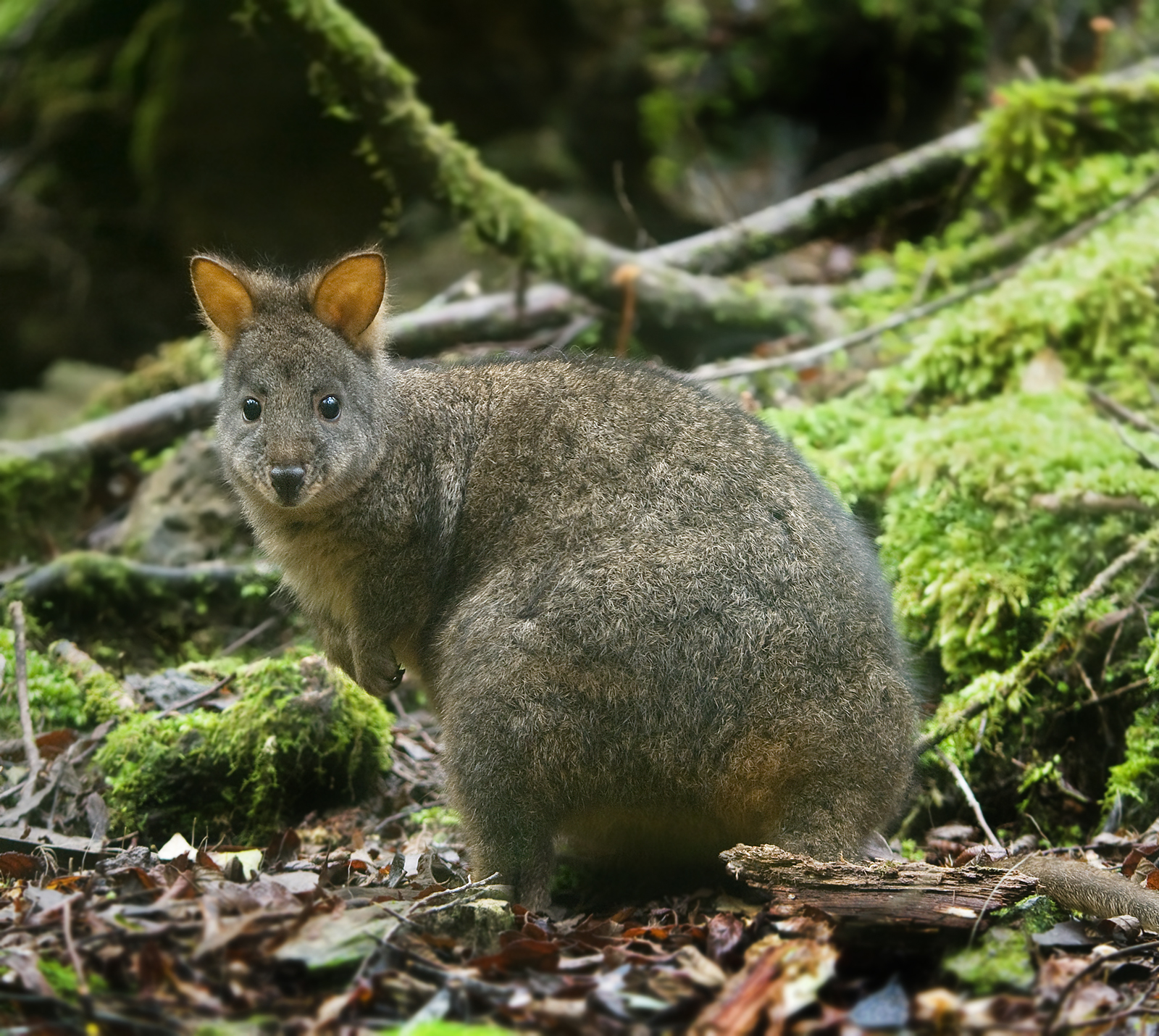
- Tasmanian pademelon, Thylogale billardierii

Scientific classification
- Kingdom: Animalia
- Phylum: Chordata
- Class: Mammalia
- Infraclass: Marsupialia
- Order: Diprotodontia
- Family: Macropodidae
- Subfamily: Macropodinae
- Genus: Thylogale; J. E. Gray, 1837

Type species
- Halmaturus (Thylogale) eugenii J. E. Gray, 1837 (=Halmaturus thetis Lesson, 1828)

Species
- 7, see text

= Pademelon =

Small terrestrial marsupial

Pademelons (/ˈpædimɛlən/) are small marsupials in the genus Thylogale, found in Australia, New Guinea, and surrounding islands. They are some of the smallest members of the macropod family, which includes the similar-looking but larger kangaroos and wallabies. Pademelons are distinguished by their small size and their short, thick, and sparsely haired tails. Like other marsupials, they carry their young in a pouch.

== Etymology ==
The word "pademelon" comes from the word badimaliyan in Dharug, an Australian Aboriginal language spoken near what is now Port Jackson, New South Wales. The scientific name Thylogale uses the Greek words for "pouch" and "weasel."

== Description ==
Along with the rock-wallabies and the hare-wallabies, the pademelons are among the smallest members of the macropod family. Mature male pademelons are larger than females, with an average weight of about 7 kg and height of 60 cm. Mature females weigh around 3.8 kg.

== Species ==
There are seven recognised species within genus Thylogale:

Image	Scientific name	Distribution
	Tasmanian pademelon or red-bellied pademelon, Thylogale billardierii	
	Brown's pademelon, Thylogale browni	
	Dusky pademelon, Thylogale brunii	
	Calaby's pademelon, Thylogale calabyi	
	Mountain pademelon, Thylogale lanatus	
	Red-legged pademelon, Thylogale stigmatica	
	Red-necked pademelon, Thylogale thetis	

== Distribution and habitat ==
The red-legged pademelon can be found in the coastal regions of Queensland and New South Wales, and in south-central New Guinea. In some areas, its range has been drastically reduced.

The red-bellied or Tasmanian pademelon is abundant in Tasmania, although it was once found throughout the southeastern parts of mainland Australia.

The dusky pademelon lives in New Guinea and surrounding islands. It was previously called the Aru Islands wallaby by Europeans, and before that was called the "philander" ("friend of man"), which is the name it bears in the second volume of Cornelis de Bruijn's Travels, originally published in 1711. The Latin name of this species is called after De Bruijn.

The natural habitat of the pademelon is in thick scrubland or dense forested undergrowth. It also makes tunnels through long grasses and bushes in swampy country.

== Threats ==
Pademelon meat used to be considered valuable and was eaten by settlers and indigenous Australians.

Aside from being killed for their meat and soft fur, their numbers have been reduced by the introduction of non-native predators such as cats, dogs, and red foxes. The rapid increase in Australia's rabbit population has also caused problems as rabbits graze on the same grasses, making less available for the pademelons. Clearing of land for urbanisation has pushed the larger wallabies and kangaroos onto land that previously was occupied by pademelons with little competition.

Tasmanian pademelons were an important part of the diet of the now-extinct thylacine, and they are still preyed on by quolls, Tasmanian devils, and wedge-tailed eagles. Despite these predators, Tasmania and its outlying smaller islands have large numbers of pademelons and every year many are culled to keep their numbers sustainable.
