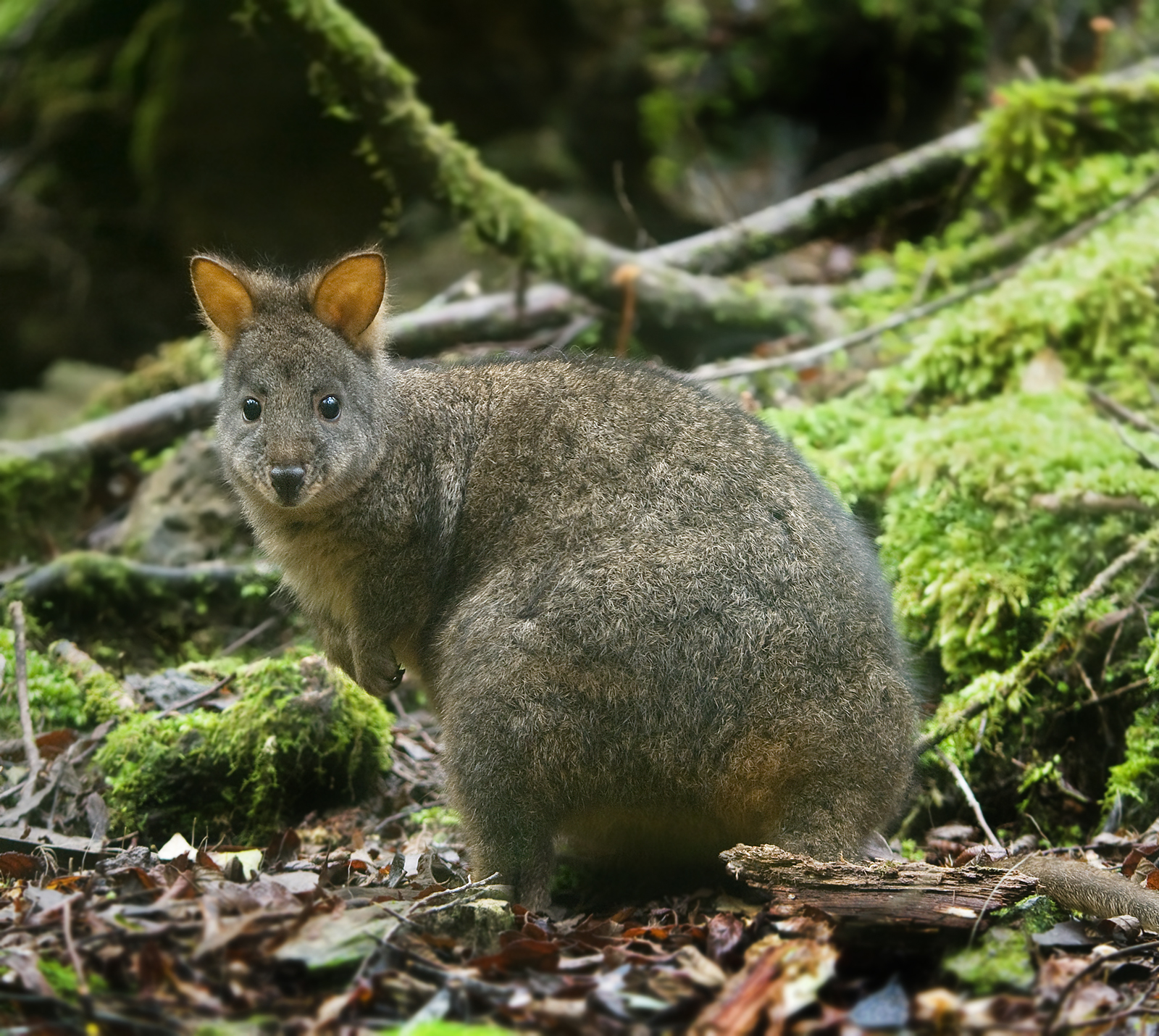
- Mt Field National Park

Conservation status
- Least Concern (IUCN 3.1)

Scientific classification
- Kingdom: Animalia
- Phylum: Chordata
- Class: Mammalia
- Infraclass: Marsupialia
- Order: Diprotodontia
- Family: Macropodidae
- Genus: Thylogale
- Species: T. billardierii

Binomial name
- Thylogale billardierii (Desmarest, 1822)
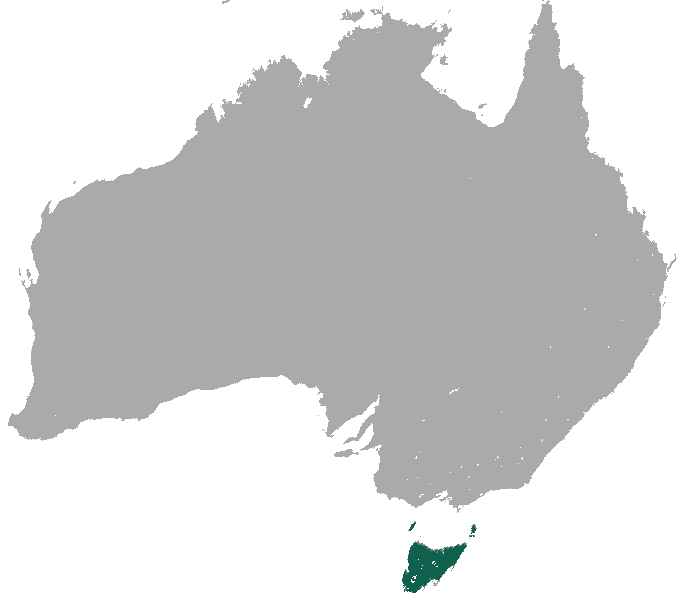
- Tasmanian pademelon range

= Tasmanian pademelon =

Species of marsupial

The Tasmanian pademelon (Thylogale billardierii), also known as the rufous-bellied pademelon or red-bellied pademelon, is the sole species of pademelon found in Tasmania, and was formerly found throughout southeastern Australia. This pademelon has developed heavier and bushier fur than its northern relatives, which inhabit eastern and northern Australia and New Guinea.

The scientific name honours J.J.H. Labillardier, who collected the first specimen on an expedition to what was then Van Diemen's Land in 1792. There are no recognised subspecies.

== Description ==
The Tasmanian pademelon has a compact body with short, rounded, ears, thick fur over the limbs, head, and body and a tail covered with short hairs. It has greyish fur over most of the body with yellowish to rufous underparts, and, unlike most other pademelons, has no distinct facial or hip markings. Males reach around 6.5 kilograms (14 lb) in weight, 70–120 centimetres (28–47 in) in length including the 30–45 centimetres (12–18 in) tail, and are considerably larger than the females, which average 4.6 kilograms (10 lb).

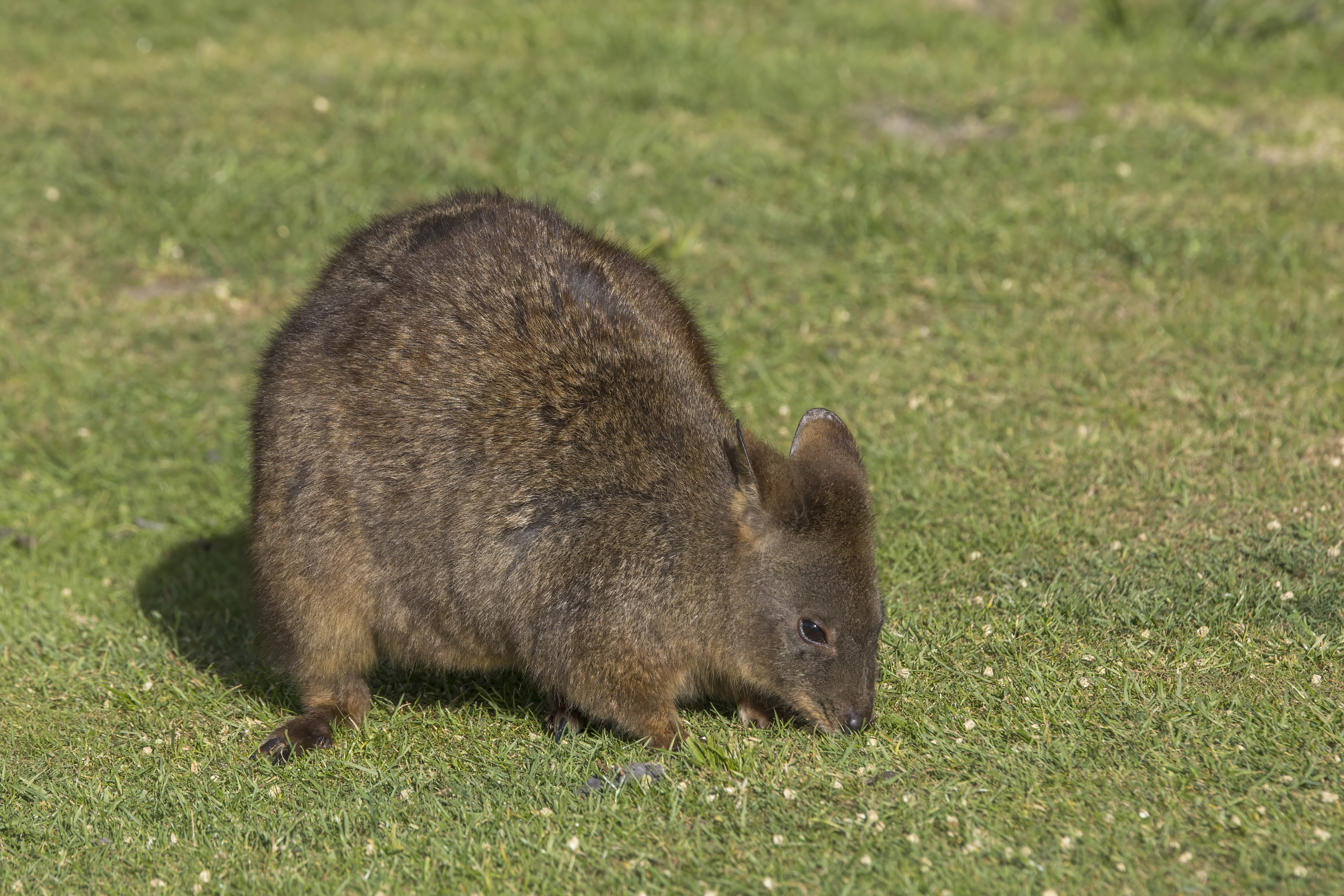
Upper Esk Valley, Tasmania

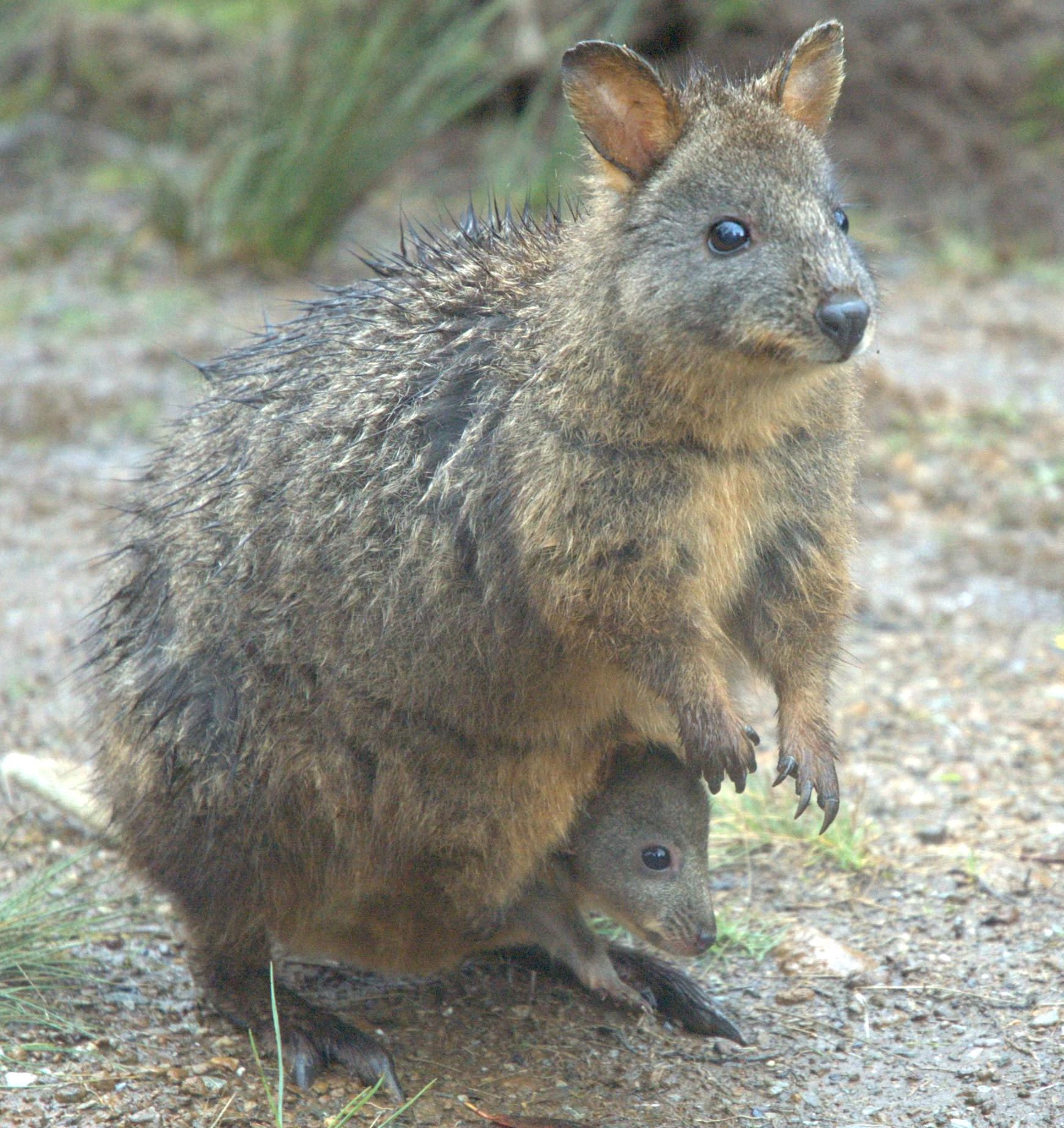
Female and her joey

== Distribution and habitat ==
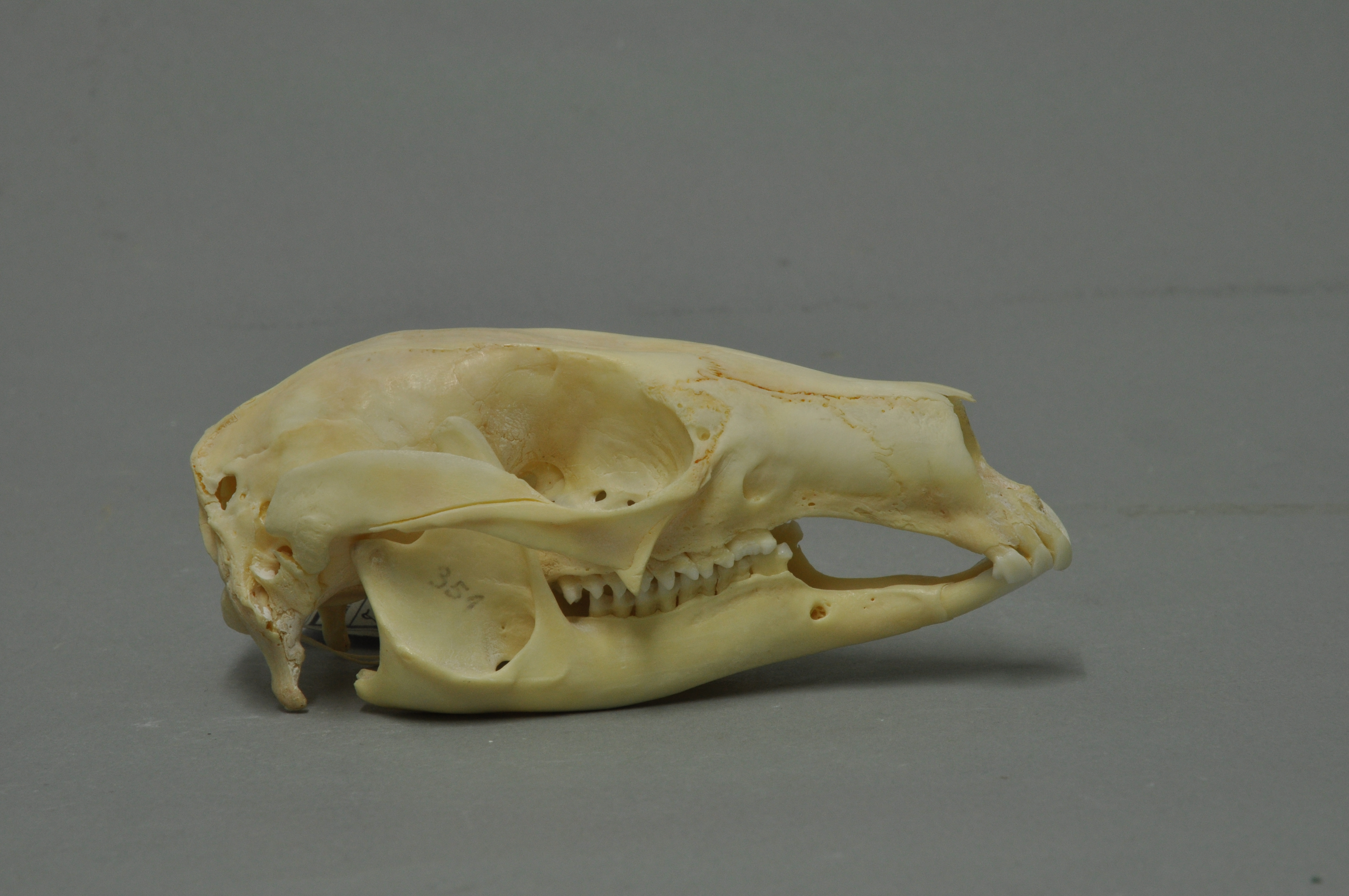
Skull of a Tasmanian pademelon

Pademelons are abundant and widespread across mainland Tasmania, and are also found on the nearby King and Furneaux Islands. They were formerly distributed throughout southeastern Australia, including areas south of the Great Dividing Range in Victoria and the Limestone Coast of South Australia until the 19th century when it was extirpated from the mainland due mainly to habitat loss and predation by introduced red foxes. Rainforest, sclerophyll forest, and scrubland are preferred, although wet gullies in dry open eucalyptus forest are also used. Such places, next to open areas where feeding can occur, are especially favoured.

== Diet and ecology ==
The Tasmanian pademelon is a herbivore feeding on a wide variety of plants, from herbs, green shoots and grass, to some nectar-bearing flowers.

Once a part of the diet of the thylacine, the Tasmanian pademelon is still preyed upon by other predators of the island, including Tasmanian devils, quolls, and eagles, as well as dogs and feral cats. Even so, they are abundant to the point of being culled occasionally (along with other wallabies) to reduce competition for grass with the farmed animals. Hunting of the Tasmanian pademelon is allowed, its pelt having some economic value and its meat being palatable.

== Behaviour ==
Pademelons are solitary and nocturnal, spending the daylight hours in thick vegetation. After dusk, the animals move onto open areas to feed, but rarely stray more than 100 metres from the forest edge. Adults have been recorded to make growling sounds during aggressive interactions, and clucking noises at other times, such as when mothers are calling to their young or males are pursuing females. They have also been reported to engage in grass-pulling behaviour, possibly as a visual signal to other members of the species. This involves standing upright, pulling up clumps of grass and throwing them against their chest. Males engage in ritualised bouts of combat to determine dominance; these are similar to those of other macropodids, including the "boxing" behaviour seen in kangaroos. Both sexes groom themselves by scratching their head and shoulders with their hind feet for up to ten minutes at a time, and mothers also groom their young for a brief time after they first emerge from the pouch.

== Reproduction ==
There is no specific breeding season, but most pademelon births seem to occur in the autumn. Males regularly sniff the females in their range, and pursue them if they are receptive, which they remain only for around 24 hours at a time. Copulation can be lengthy, consisting of several bouts, with the animals resting for up to 15 minutes between each session.

Gestation lasts 30 days. The young measure around 16 millimetres (0.63 in) in total length at birth, and rapidly move to the pouch, where they attach to one of the four teats. They grow relatively slowly compared with other marsupials of their size, opening their eyes between weeks 18 and 20, and first developing fur between weeks 20 and 22. They are fully furred by around 160 days, at which point they first begin to poke their head out of the pouch. The first full emergence from the pouch can occur from this time up until around 190 days of age, although they continue to suckle for another three months, after which the mother becomes aggressive towards them. The mother often gives birth to a second joey while still nursing an older one that has already left the pouch, and typically gives birth to 1.3 young per year.

Joeys are sexually mature at 17 months for males or 13 months for females. Lifespan in the wild is unknown, but has been estimated to be between 5 and 6 years.
