= Gympietides =

Family of pain-causing neurotoxins

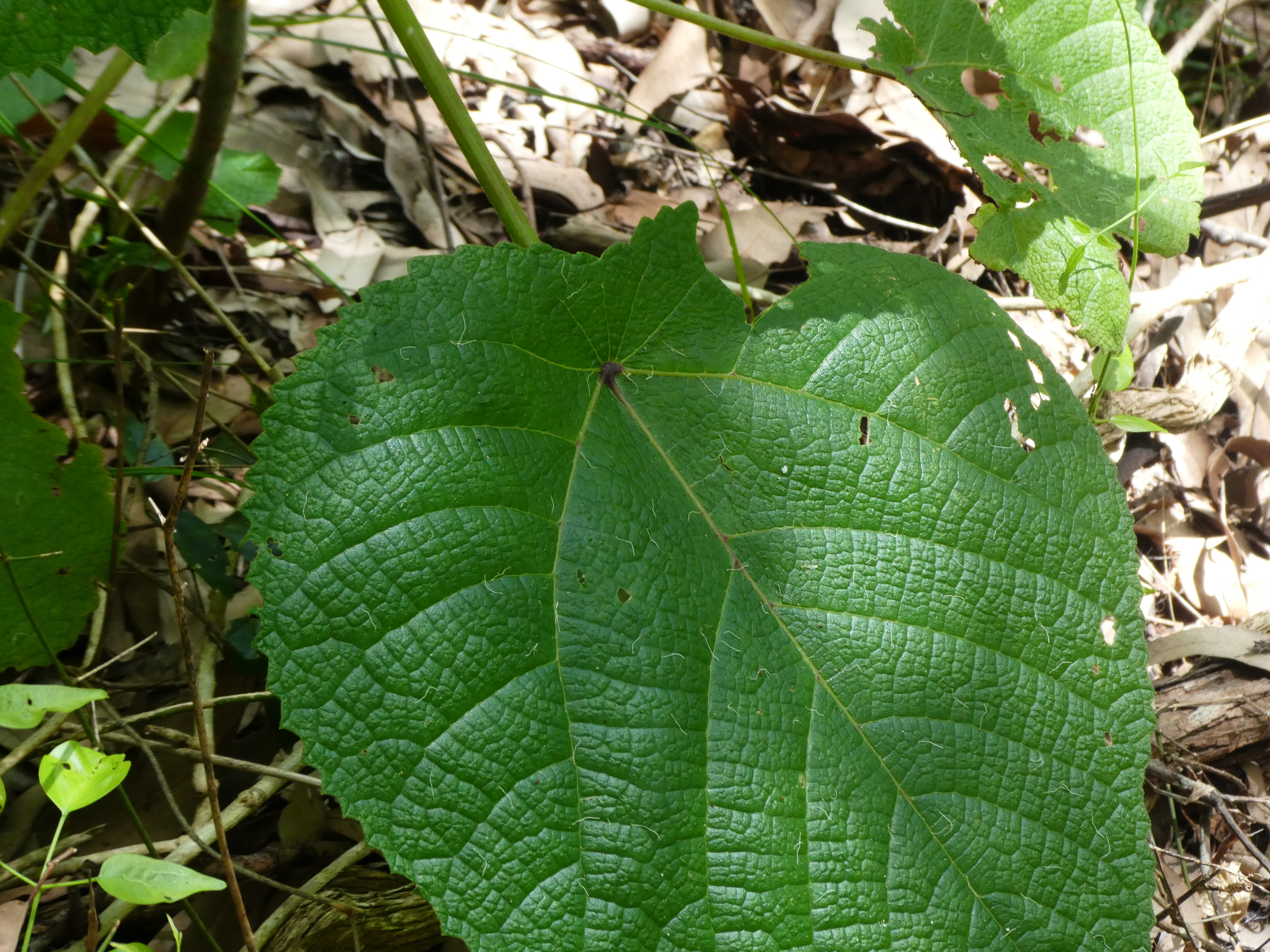
Dendrocnide moroides produces these neurotoxic peptides

Gympietides are a peptide family of neurotoxins that target pain receptors and permanently change and inactivate voltage-gated sodium channels in sensory neurons to produce long-lasting pain. The highly stable nature of these peptides means that they can repeatedly stimulate these sensory neurons, prolonging the pain. Their 3D molecular structure makes Gympietides similar to spider or cone snail toxins.

The species Dendrocnide moroides produces gympietides. These toxins give D. moroides its notoriously painful toxic stings, which can last from a few hours up to a year. Dendrocnide excelsa also produces gympietides.

== Name ==
They get their name after the species of plant Dendrocnide moroides, commonly known as gympie-gympie.

== Structure ==
All known gympietides have a very similar primary structure. The tertiary structure of Excelsatoxin A was determined via NMR spectroscopy, showing a cystine-knot structure. The other members of the family are predicted to have very similar 3D structures.

>sp|P0DQP4|NTXA_DENMD           Moroidotoxin A
IPRCDSPLCSLFRIGLCGDKCFCVPLPIVGICVPSV
>sp|P0DQP3|NTXA_DENEC           Excelsatoxin A
LPRCDSPFCSLFRIGLCGDKCTCVPLPIFGLCVPDV
>tr|A0A7G9XV74|A0A7G9XV74_DENEC Excelsatoxin B
LPRCDSPFCSLFRMGLCGDKCICVPLPIFGICVPNV

== Medicine ==
They could have potential therapeutic use in pain relief by providing a scaffold (a protein used as a starting point for the design of antibody mimetics).
