= Prorodes =

Scientific classification
- Domain: Eukaryota
- Kingdom: Animalia
- Phylum: Arthropoda
- Class: Insecta
- Order: Lepidoptera
- Family: Crambidae
- Subfamily: Spilomelinae
- Genus: Prorodes; C. Swinhoe, 1894

Synonyms
- Idiostrophe Warren, 1896

Genus of moths

Prorodes is a genus of moths of the family Crambidae. It was described by Charles Swinhoe in 1894, with Prorodes mimica as type species.

== Species ==
- Prorodes camofelica Kirti & Kaur, 2009
- Prorodes leucothyralis Mabille, 1900
- Prorodes mimica C. Swinhoe, 1894
