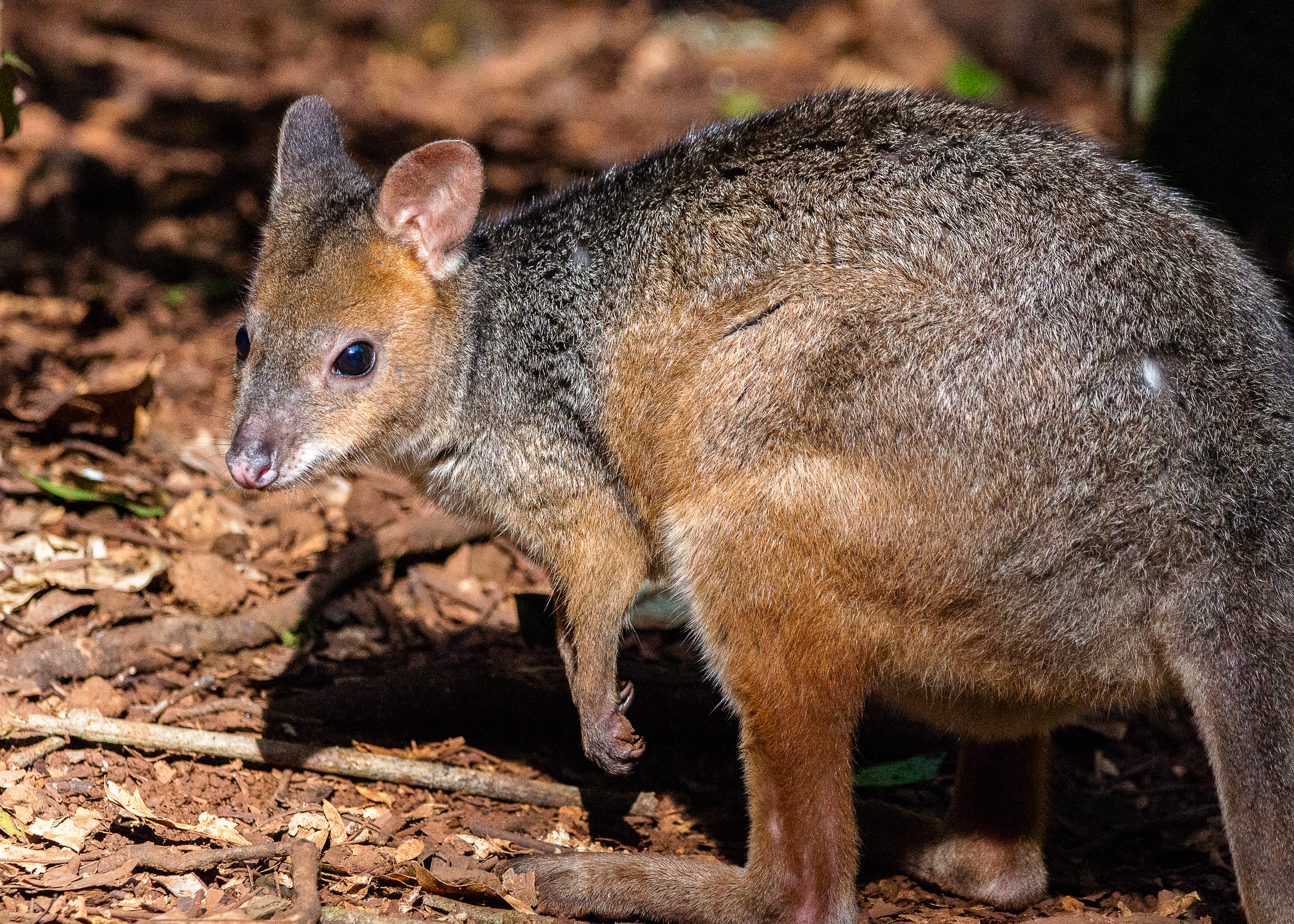
- Thylogale stigmatica

Conservation status
- Least Concern (IUCN 3.1)

Scientific classification
- Kingdom: Animalia
- Phylum: Chordata
- Class: Mammalia
- Infraclass: Marsupialia
- Order: Diprotodontia
- Family: Macropodidae
- Genus: Thylogale
- Species: T. stigmatica

Binomial name
- Thylogale stigmatica (Gould, 1860)
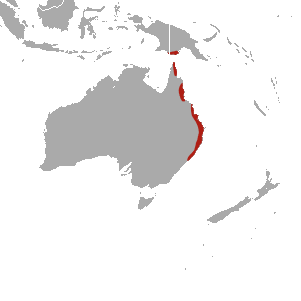
- Red-legged pademelon range

= Red-legged pademelon =

Species of marsupial

The red-legged pademelon (Thylogale stigmatica) is a species of small macropod found on the northeastern coast of Australia and in New Guinea. In Australia it has a scattered distribution from the tip of Cape York Peninsula in Queensland to around Tamworth in New South Wales. In New Guinea it is found in south central lowlands.

The red-legged pademelon is usually solitary but may group together when feeding. It is found mostly in rainforests, where it is rarely seen, but it is not considered threatened. In New South Wales, however, it is considered to be vulnerable. It feeds on fallen fruit, leaves and grasses. It weighs 2.5 to 7 kg and is 38–58 cm long with a 30–47 cm tail.

There are four subspecies of the red-legged pademelon:

- T. s. stigmatica, found in the Cairns region of Queensland;
- T. s. coxenii, found in Cape York Peninsula;
- T. s. orimo, found in New Guinea;
- T. s. wilcoxi, found in southern Queensland and New South Wales.

== Introduction ==
The red-legged pademelon, a member of the family Macropodidae (which includes wallabies, kangaroos, etc.), is a kangaroo species that inhabits the rainforests. Like many marsupials, the newborn pademelon is underdeveloped and is carried and nursed in a pouch on the mother's belly. Red-legged pademelons are unique in that they are the only ground-dwelling wallaby that resides in the Wet Tropics rainforests. Although there are several subspecies of red-legged pademelon, this article focuses on Thylogale stigmatica (T. stigmatica). They can be found in both rainforests and open areas.

== Physical appearance ==
=== Colour ===
Red-legged pademelons have soft thick fur, grey-brown on the back and cream on the belly. The cheeks forearms, outside and inside of their hind legs are a rusty brown colour. Its common name refers to the rusty colour on the limbs. They also have a pale cream stripe on their outer thigh. Rainforest forms are usually darker in colour than those from the open country.

=== Other physical features ===
Pademelons have a short and thick tail, and their height can range from 35–58 cm when not standing upright. An average-sized pademelon may stand at a height of 75 cm (2 1/2 ft). Additionally, their tail measures between 30–47 cm in length and their weight varies from 2.5 to 7 kg.

== Habitat ==
Due to land clearance, red-legged pademelons have suffered a reduction in range, but they still remain common where the habitat remains, and they are not seriously disturbed by selective loggings. Distribution is discontinuous, especially in the north where it appears to be limited by the availability of vegetation providing satisfactory cover. The red-legged pademelon seems to prefer rainforest areas, but is also found near both sclerophyll and dry vine scrubs. Extensive rainforest clearing has reduced its available habitat, but sufficient parks and reserves currently exist throughout their range to secure their status. Forest clearing may benefit the red-legged pademelon to a certain point. A higher number of forest fragments means the pademelons have more adequate pastures that provide them with sufficient food. Only two types of subspecies inhabit Australia; Thylogale stigmatica and the Thylogale wilcoxi.

== Life cycle and diet ==
=== Diet ===
Red-legged pademelons mainly eat fallen leaves, but sometimes they eat fresh leaves. They also feed on fruits and berries from shrubs, the Moreton Bay Fig from the southern part of its range and the fruit of the Burdekin plum from the northern part. The Moreton Bay Fig and the Burdekin Plum are major food sources. They sometimes eat the fishbone fern, king orchid, and grasses like Paspalum notatum and Cyrtococcum oxyphyllum. Red-legged pademelons eat the bark of trees and cicadas. They affect regeneration of the rainforest as they browse on the young trees and can seriously impede their growth or even kill them. They are one of the very few animals, and the only known mammal, that can eat the leaves of the Gympie Gympie (Dendrocnide moroides), whose undersides are coated in thousands of fine silica needles that can inject a potent neurotoxin.

=== Life cycle ===
The red-legged pademelon lifespan ranges between 4 and 9.7 years. This can be due to predation and forest fire. After a forest fire, predation levels increase due to reduced forest cover.

== Reproduction ==
Pademelons have a gestation period of 28–30 days. Their oestrous cycle is 29–32 days. Mating occurs 2–12 hours after the birth of the young. The gender of pouch-young is distinguished at 3 to 4 weeks. Teat detachment occurs at 13–18 weeks. Ears become erect at 15–18 weeks. Eyes open at 16–18 weeks. Hair becomes visible at 19–21 weeks. Young leave the pouch at 26–28 weeks. Young start eating food at approximately 66 days after leaving the pouch. Females become mature at about 48 weeks. Males become mature at about 66 weeks. Then the process starts again. When it is born, the tiny blind baby has only been developing for 3 to 6 weeks. Its limbs are hardly developed but its forelimbs are well enough developed to haul itself through its mother's belly hair to reach the pouch. Shortly after giving birth the female macropod becomes receptive again. If she successfully mates, she will again fall pregnant.

=== Parental care ===
The female macropod enters a state of embryonic diapause if she becomes pregnant. This causes the blastocyst, or new embryo, to enter a state of suspended animation until its older sibling is old enough to leave the pouch. Once the joey leaves, the blastocyst resumes development. Even after leaving the pouch, the joey may continue to suckle from the teat it used while in the pouch. This enables the mother to provide different types of milk for the more developed and less developed offspring. This reproductive strategy is also used by honey possums, bats, seals, and other macropods. Embryonic diapause is highly efficient as it allows for the rapid replacement of lost or deceased young.

== Adaptations ==
Females of the species have a pouch in which they keep their incompletely developed young. Mother red-legged pademelons make soft clucking noises to call their young. They are often found in small groups, foraging 30-50m apart so that they can warn each other of oncoming predators. They are largely nocturnal.

== Behaviour ==
Red-legged pademelon behaviour varies under different circumstances. They are least active in the hours around midday and midnight. Late afternoon, evening and early morning they can be seen grazing on open grassland near the rainforest edges but quickly retreat into the forest if disturbed. They are generally solitary but may group together at night while feeding on grasslands. They feed at equal distances apart and are under the control of one dominant pademelon that controls their feeding area and sets their feeding distance. They communicate by vocalisations and thumping their heels on the ground. They use several vocalizations in social behaviour. In hostile interactions and if a female rejects a male during courtship, a harsh rasping sound is uttered. Soft clucking sounds are made by the courting male, similar sounds are made when a mother is calling her young.

The security of their family structure, as well as their speed and agility in closed rainforest protects them against most feral animal attacks. When the animal is resting, it sits on the base of its tail whilst placing the rest of it between the hind legs. The animal then leans back against a rock or sapling. As it falls asleep, its head leans forward to rest on the tail or on the ground beside it.

The main predators of Thylogale stigmatica are dingoes, tiger quolls, Australian scrub pythons, and occasionally feral domestic dogs. The rate of predation increases following a forest fire, when there is less forest cover. They detect predators by spreading out when foraging. Each pademelon can watch for predators on its particular area. If a predator is seen, a warning to others in the area is spread by a thumping sound made by the hind legs. This is an example of honest signalling.
