= Prorodes mimica =

Scientific classification
- Domain: Eukaryota
- Kingdom: Animalia
- Phylum: Arthropoda
- Class: Insecta
- Order: Lepidoptera
- Family: Crambidae
- Genus: Prorodes
- Species: P. mimica

Binomial name
- Prorodes mimica C. Swinhoe, 1894

Synonyms
- Notarcha triparalis Warren, 1896; Idiostrophe albipunctata Warren, 1896

Species of moth

Prorodes mimica is a moth in the family Crambidae. It was described by Charles Swinhoe in 1894. It is found in north-eastern India, Myanmar, Malaysia, Ambon Island, New Guinea and Australia, where it has been recorded from New South Wales and Queensland.

The wingspan is about 36 mm. The forewings are dark bronzy fuscous, with darker indistinct markings, indicated by pale whitish spots that follow them.
