= Celtis lindheimeri =

Conservation status
- Critically Endangered (IUCN 3.1)

Scientific classification
- Kingdom: Plantae
- Clade: Tracheophytes
- Clade: Angiosperms
- Clade: Eudicots
- Clade: Rosids
- Order: Rosales
- Family: Cannabaceae
- Genus: Celtis
- Species: C. lindheimeri

Binomial name
- Celtis lindheimeri Engelm. ex K.Koch
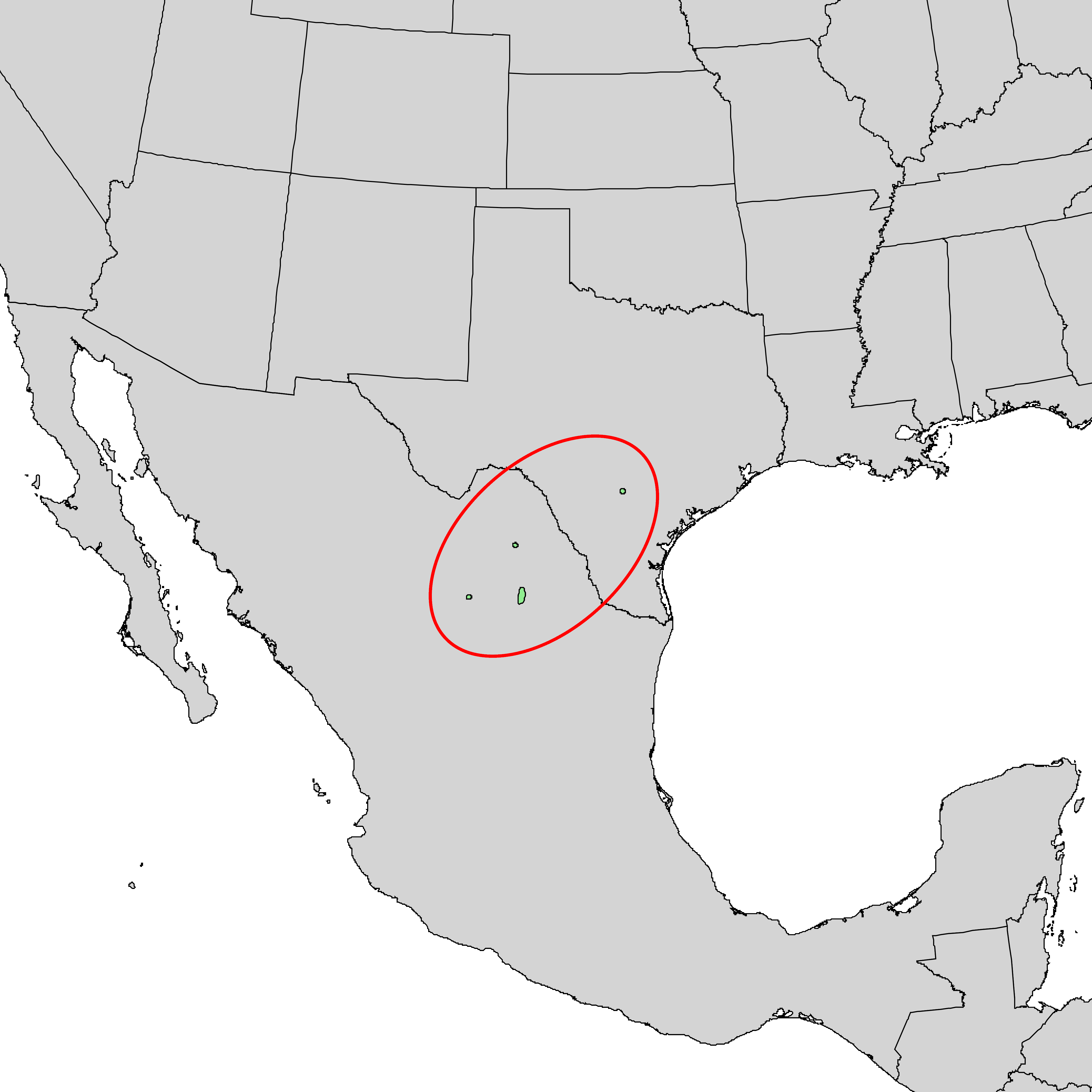
- Natural range of Celtis lindheimeri

Synonyms
- Celtis helleri Small

Species of plant

Celtis lindheimeri, also called Lindheimer's hackberry, is a species of tree in the family Cannabaceae. It is typically found in areas of central Texas and northeastern Mexico. It has a height averaging 9 meters, and produces a reddish-brown berry. It is a species closely related to netleaf hackberry which is common in western United States. The Spanish common name is "palo blanco", meaning "white tree", which is commonly used to identify this tree. It is named after its discoverer Ferdinand Lindheimer, a German-born botanical collector and Texas newspaper editor.

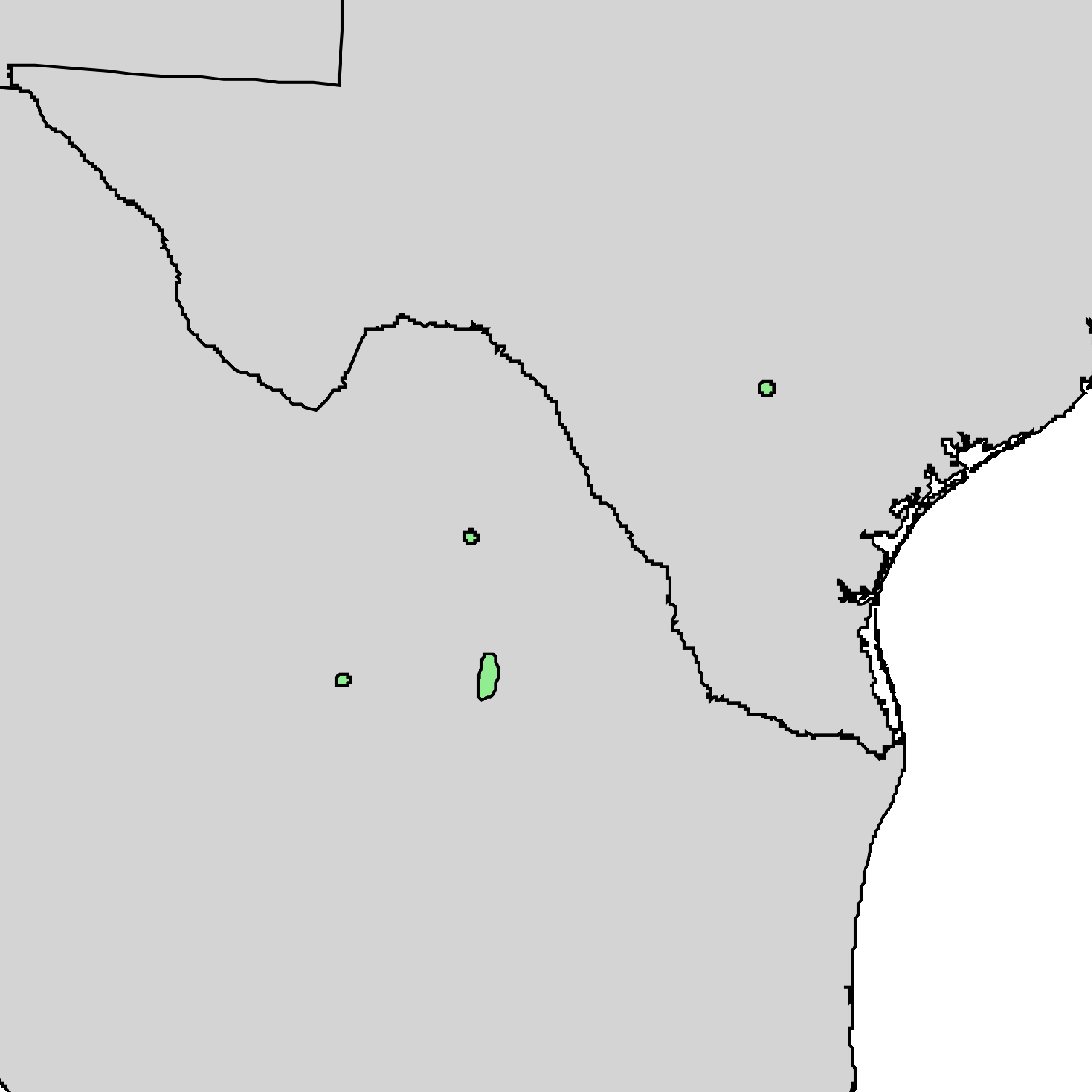
Natural range
