= Celtis balansae =

Conservation status
- Vulnerable (IUCN 3.1)

Scientific classification
- Kingdom: Plantae
- Clade: Tracheophytes
- Clade: Angiosperms
- Clade: Eudicots
- Clade: Rosids
- Order: Rosales
- Family: Cannabaceae
- Genus: Celtis
- Species: C. balansae

Binomial name
- Celtis balansae Planch.

Species of flowering plant

Celtis balansae is a species of plant in the family Cannabaceae. It is endemic to New Caledonia.
