= Celtis loxensis =

Scientific classification
- Kingdom: Plantae
- Clade: Tracheophytes
- Clade: Angiosperms
- Clade: Eudicots
- Clade: Rosids
- Order: Rosales
- Family: Cannabaceae
- Genus: Celtis
- Species: C. loxensis

Binomial name
- Celtis loxensis C.C.Berg

Species of tree

Celtis loxensis is a species of tree in the family Cannabaceae. It is native to Peru, Bolivia and Ecuador.

== Description ==
The trees are 3-7m tall, with smooth greyish white bark.

== Ecology ==
It occurs in semi-deciduous thorn scrub dominated by Cactaceae and Euphorbiaceae species. The type specimen was collected at about 1500 m.a.s.l. near Catamayo, Ecuador.
