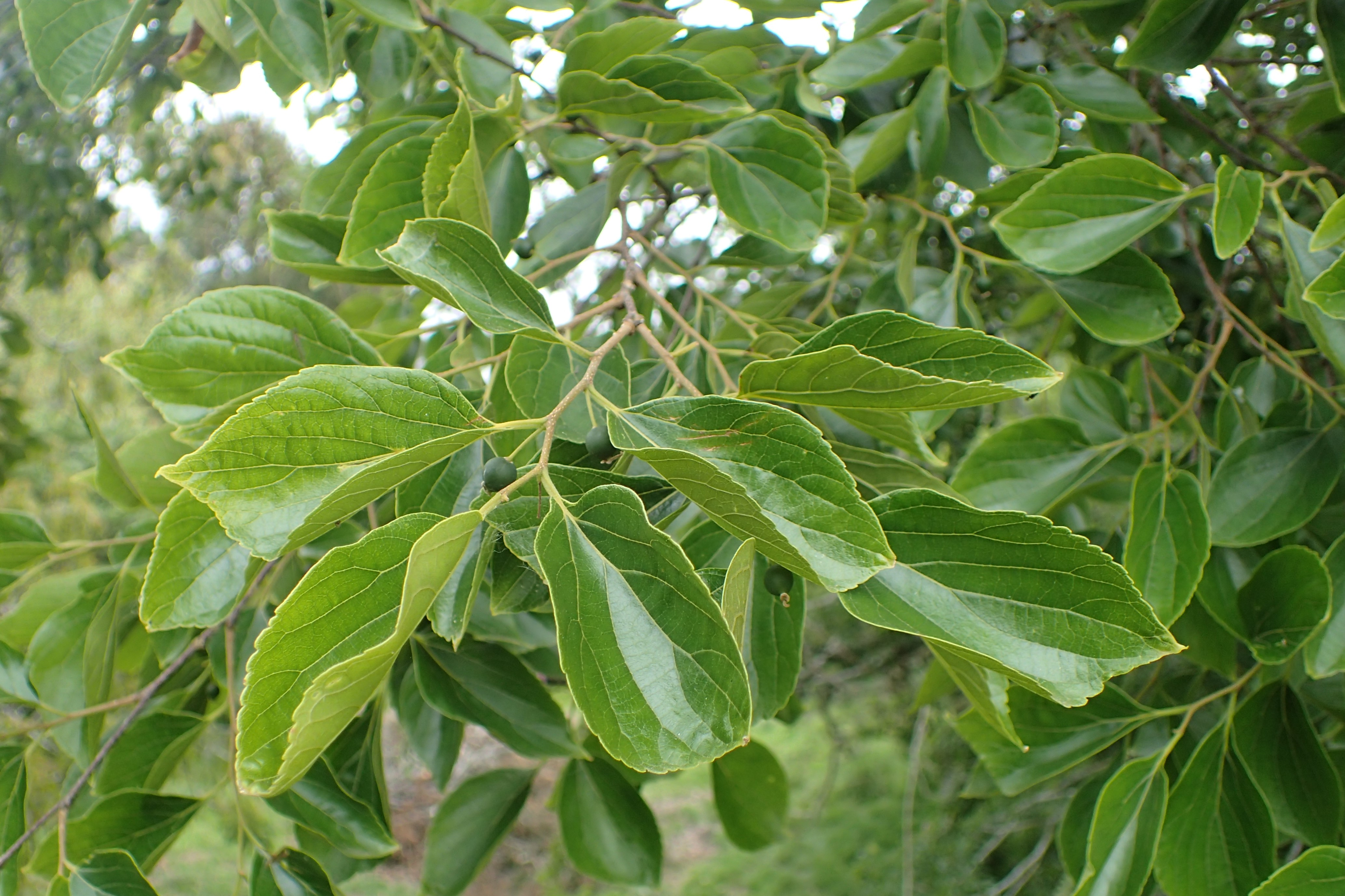
- Leaves and unripe fruit

Conservation status
- Least Concern (IUCN 3.1)

Scientific classification
- Kingdom: Plantae
- Clade: Embryophytes
- Clade: Tracheophytes
- Clade: Spermatophytes
- Clade: Angiosperms
- Clade: Eudicots
- Clade: Rosids
- Order: Rosales
- Family: Cannabaceae
- Genus: Celtis
- Species: C. biondii

Binomial name
- Celtis biondii Pamp.

Synonyms
- Celtis biondii var. cavalieriei C.K.Schneid.; Celtis biondii var. heterophylla (H.Lév.) C.K.Schneid.; Celtis biondii f. holophylla (Nakai) Koji Ito; Celtis biondii var. holophylla (Nakai) E.W.Ma; Celtis bungeana var. heterophylla H.Lév.; Celtis cavaleriei H.Lév.; Celtis chuanchowensis F.P.Metcalf; Celtis emuyaca F.P.Metcalf; Celtis emuyaca var. cuspidatophylla (F.P.Metcalf) C.P'ei; Celtis guangxiensis Chun; Celtis leveillei Nakai; Celtis leveillei var. cuspidatophylla F.P.Metcalf; Celtis leveillei var. heterophylla (H.Lév.) Nakai; Celtis leveillei var. hirtifolia Hand.-Mazz.; Celtis leveillei var. holophylla Nakai; Celtis rockii Rehder; Celtis trichocarpa C.C.Cheng & E.W.Ma

= Celtis biondii =

Species of flowering plant

Celtis biondii (Chinese: 紫弹树; pinyin: zidanshu; lit. 'purple bullet tree') is a species of hackberry native to China, Taiwan, Korea, and Japan. It prefers to grow on limestone in the floristic assemblage that is thought to also include wild Ginkgo biloba. It is a deciduous tree growing 18 m (59 ft) tall.
