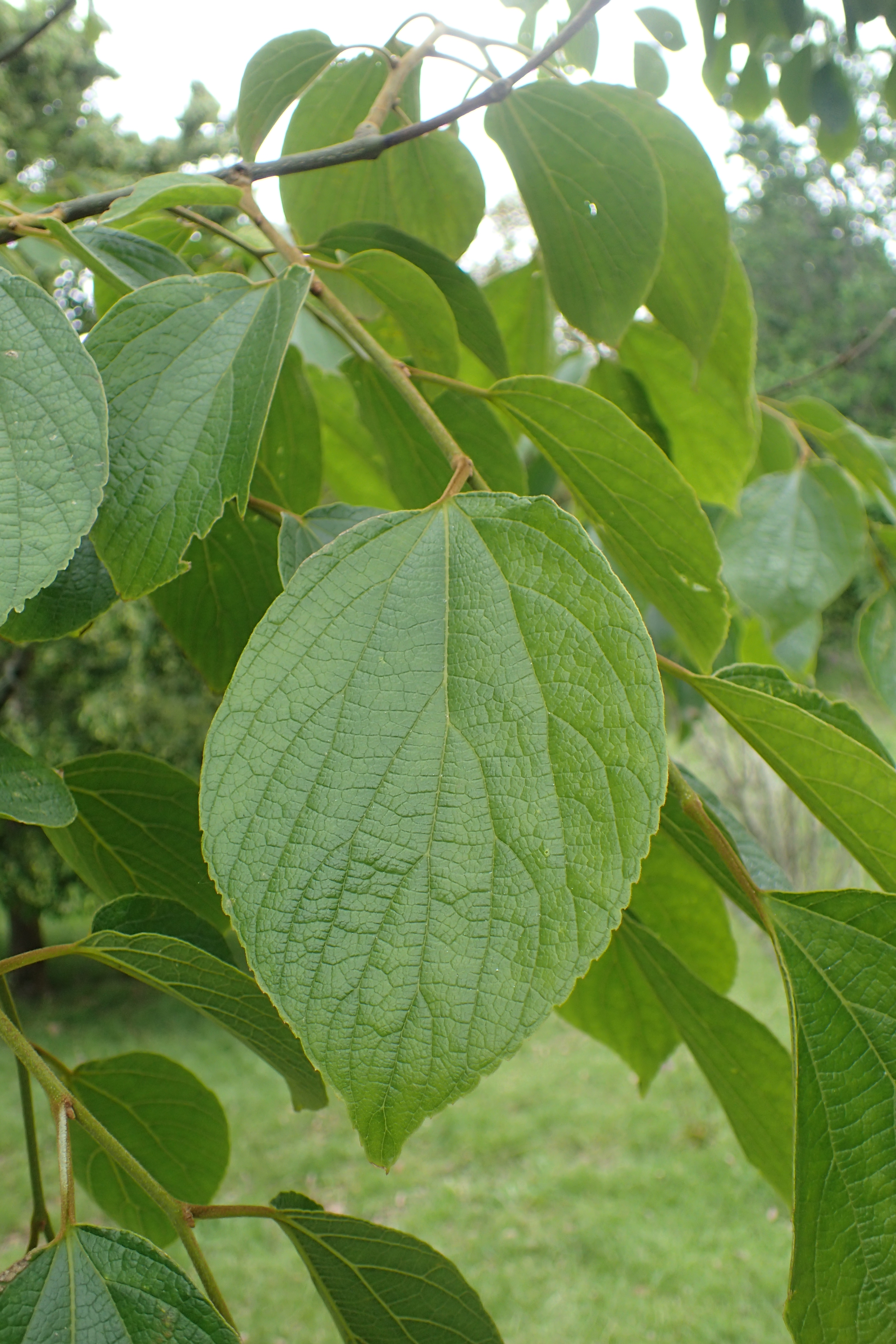
- Close-up of leaf

Scientific classification
- Kingdom: Plantae
- Clade: Embryophytes
- Clade: Tracheophytes
- Clade: Spermatophytes
- Clade: Angiosperms
- Clade: Eudicots
- Clade: Rosids
- Order: Rosales
- Family: Cannabaceae
- Genus: Celtis
- Species: C. julianae

Binomial name
- Celtis julianae C.K.Schneid.

= Celtis julianae =

Species of flowering plant

Celtis julianae, the Julian hackberry, is a species of flowering plant in the family Cannabaceae, native to central and southern China. It is a fast-growing deciduous tree with gray bark reaching 80 ft (24 m). In the wild it is typically found growing in forested valleys and on slopes at 300 to 1,300 m (1,000 to 4,300 ft) above sea level.

It has found use as a street tree in a number of Chinese and French cities, and is commercially available in Europe and North America, but not in the United Kingdom.
