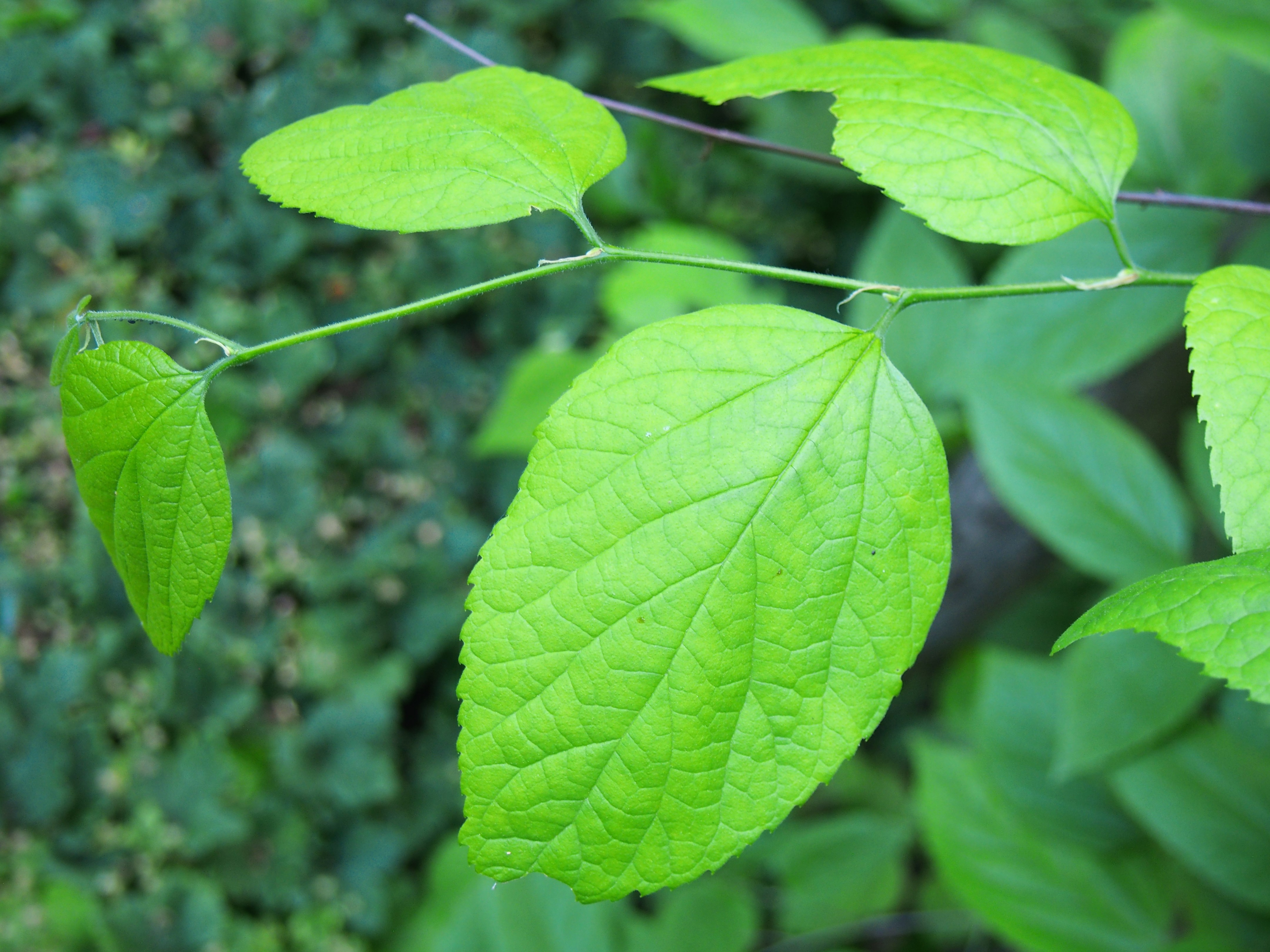
- Foliage

Conservation status
- Least Concern (IUCN 3.1)

Scientific classification
- Kingdom: Plantae
- Clade: Tracheophytes
- Clade: Angiosperms
- Clade: Eudicots
- Clade: Rosids
- Order: Rosales
- Family: Cannabaceae
- Genus: Celtis
- Species: C. caucasica

Binomial name
- Celtis caucasica Willd.

Synonyms
- Celtis arcata Buch.-Ham. ex Wall.; Celtis australis subsp. caucasica (Willd.) C.C.Towns.; Celtis caucasica subsp. caudata (Planch.) Grudz.; Celtis inglisii Royle; Celtis tupalangi Vassilcz.

= Celtis caucasica =

Species of flowering plant

Celtis caucasica, the Caucasian hackberry or Caucasian nettle tree, is a species of flowering plant in the family Cannabaceae. It is native to the Caucasus region, Central Asia, and on to the western Himalaya. Hardy to USDA zone 5b, it tolerates poor soils, drought, and nearby paving, and can be used as street tree. It is a nitrogen-fixer, in symbiosis with the mycorrhizal fungi Funneliformis mosseae and Rhizophagus intraradices.
