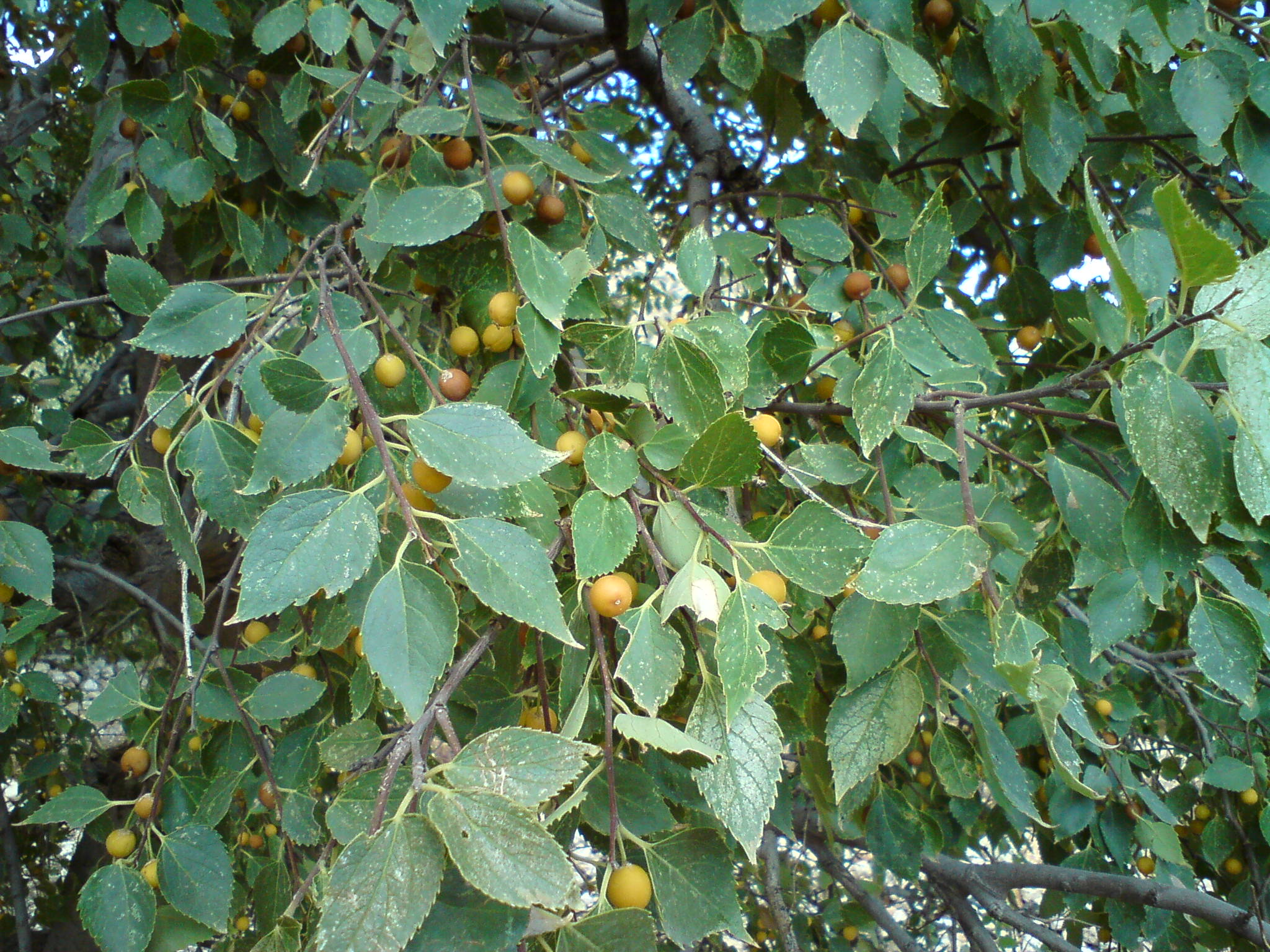

Conservation status
- Least Concern (IUCN 3.1)

Scientific classification
- Kingdom: Plantae
- Clade: Embryophytes
- Clade: Tracheophytes
- Clade: Spermatophytes
- Clade: Angiosperms
- Clade: Eudicots
- Clade: Rosids
- Order: Rosales
- Family: Cannabaceae
- Genus: Celtis
- Species: C. tournefortii

Binomial name
- Celtis tournefortii Lam.

= Celtis tournefortii =

Oriental hackberry

Species of flowering plant

Celtis tournefortii, commonly known as the oriental hackberry, is a deciduous tree in the genus Celtis. The species is found in southeastern Europe from Sicily east to the Balkans and Crimea, West Asia, and the Caucasus. It can grow up to 6 metres (20 ft) in height and grows in plains and dry forests.

== Taxonomy ==
The Sicilian subspecies, C. tournefortii aetnensis, is frequently treated as a distinct species.

== Description ==
The oriental hackberry can grow to be a big shrub or a small tree with a height of less than 6 m.

== Distribution and habitat ==
In Europe, the oriental hackberry is distributed from Sicily east through the Balkans to Crimea and Cyprus. It is known from Croatia, Bosnia and Herzegovina, Albania, North Macedonia, Bulgaria, and Greece. Greek records from the Peloponnese and the Cyclades are very old and the species may now be absent from these regions. The species' West Asian records are from Turkey, Iran, and Iraq, while its range in the Caucasus includes Armenia, Azerbaijan, and Georgia. Despite its wide range, the species generally has a patchy distribution wherever it occurs.

The hackberry inhabits maquis and dry forests on plains and rocky slopes.

== Conservation ==
The oriental hackberry is listed as being of least concern on the IUCN Red List due to its large range and number of known populations. Despite its large range, the hackberry is a typically a rare plant plant across its range with a patchy distribution. It has undergone local declines due to habitat loss in several regions and is described as being very rare in Bulgaria. Threats to the species include urbanisation and agricultural expansion in Cyprus, where the species has a population of around 500 plants, and habitat degradation caused by agriculture in Sicily. In the national-level Red Lists, the oriental hackberry is listed as being endangered in Cyprus, vulnerable in Albania, vulnerable in Bosnia, and near-threatened in Italy.

The species is edible and is eaten in Turkey.
