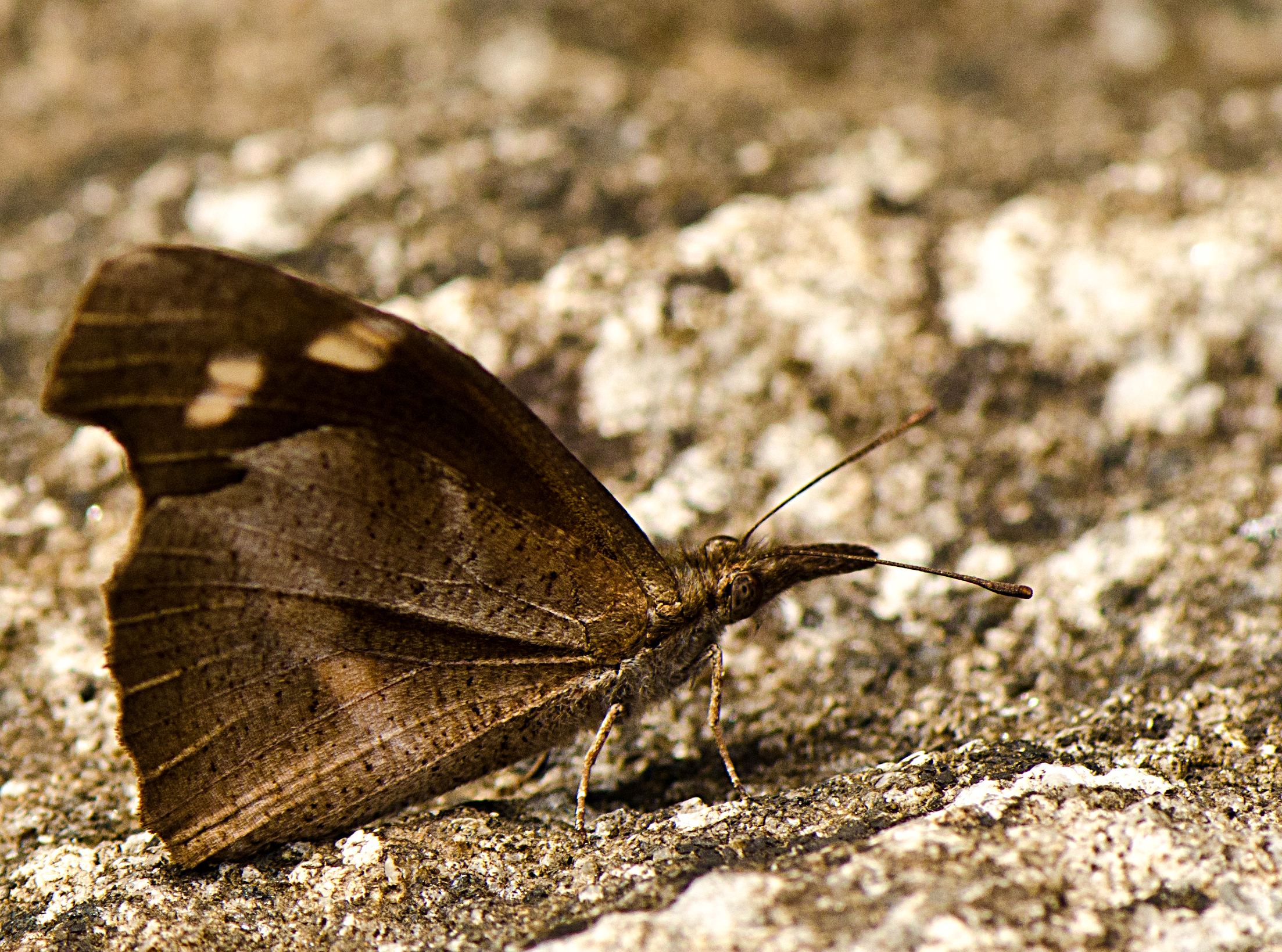

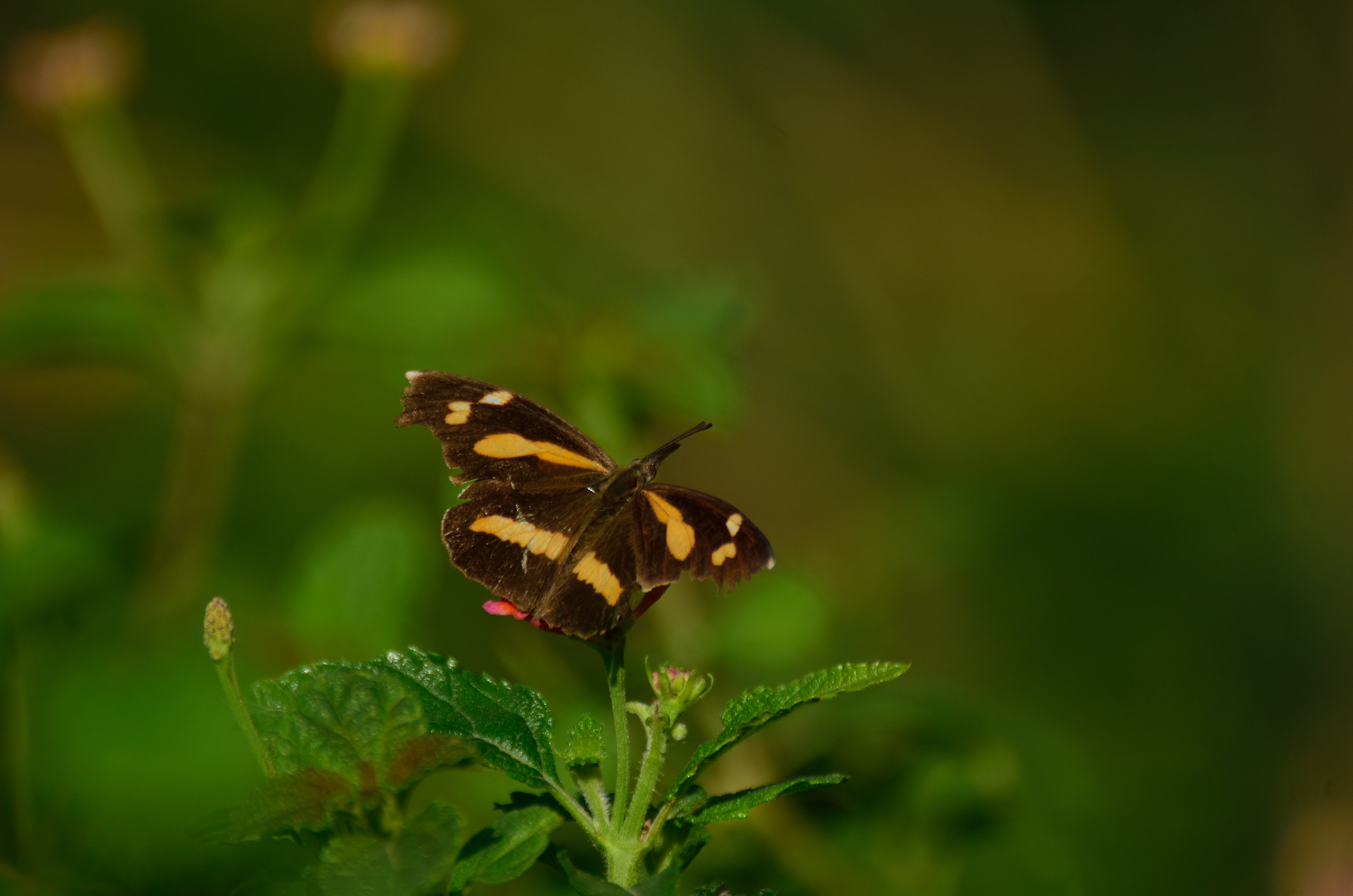

Scientific classification
- Kingdom: Animalia
- Phylum: Arthropoda
- Clade: Pancrustacea
- Class: Insecta
- Order: Lepidoptera
- Family: Nymphalidae
- Genus: Libythea
- Species: L. myrrha

Binomial name
- Libythea myrrha Godart, 1819

= Libythea myrrha =

Club beak

Species of butterfly

Libythea myrrha, the club beak, is a butterfly found in India that belongs to the Libytheinae group of the brush-footed butterflies family found in the Indomalayan realm.

== Description ==
Variable in the extent and breadth of the orange-yellow markings and in the mottling and ground colour of the underside. Typically males and females have the ground colour on the upperside dark brown, with the following orange-yellow markings: Forewing: a streak from the base along the median vein extending narrowly on each side of it and continued beyond as a comparatively large oval spot in base of interspace 2; two preapical double spots placed obliquely to the costa. Hindwing uniform, with a slightly oblique narrow medial band extending from vein 1 to vein 5. Underside forewing: ground colour brown; orange-yellow markings as on the upperside, but broader, more diffuse; apex and dorsal margin broadly shaded with pale grey irrorated with minute dark spots and transverse short striae. Hindwing greyish brown irrorated (sprinkled) with minute dark spots and short transverse striae, and shaded in the cell, on the middle of the costal margin, and on the middle of the termen with diffuse brown. Antennae, head, thorax and abdomen dark brown; beneath, palpi, thorax and abdomen greyish brown.

The larger varieties, with very broad orange markings on both forewings and hindwings, have been separated as race sanguinalis. This is chiefly a Himalayan and eastern form. Variety rama Moore is the smaller southern and Sri Lankan form, with the orange markings much narrower and restricted and the preapical double spots entirely white, or white slightly suffused with yellow. Every gradation between the two forms, however, can be found. Many specimens are identical with typical forms from Java.

Wingspan of 46–58 mm.

Found along the Himalayas, from Kulu to Sikkim; the Western Ghats and southern India; Sri Lanka; Assam; Myanmar; Tenasserim; the Malayan Peninsula; China.

=== Larva ===
"Colour dark green, sometimes with a brownish tinge, with a thin dorsal light yellow line from segments 4 to 12 and a narrow yellow supra-spiracular band from the head to the anal end." (Lionel de Nicéville)

=== Pupa ===
"The front of the pupa seen from above is absolutely square, the head ending in a broad straight edge; ... thorax somewhat convex and highly carinated along the dorsal line. ...; wings slightly thickened at and behind the shoulder; ... colour light green with the tops on all the carinations yellow, with a black speck on the abdominal peak; the surface of the pupa smooth, somewhat shiny." (de Nicéville)

== Habits ==
It is known to mud-puddle.

== Food plant ==
Celtis tetrandra (Cannabaceae) (de Nicéville)

== See also ==
- List of butterflies of India
- List of butterflies of India (Nymphalidae)
