= Celtis adolfi-friderici =

Conservation status
- Least Concern (IUCN 3.1)

Scientific classification
- Kingdom: Plantae
- Clade: Tracheophytes
- Clade: Angiosperms
- Clade: Eudicots
- Clade: Rosids
- Order: Rosales
- Family: Cannabaceae
- Genus: Celtis
- Species: C. adolfi-friderici

Binomial name
- Celtis adolfi-friderici Engl.

Species of plant

Celtis adolfi-friderici, the diania, is a widespread species of flowering plant in the family Cannabaceae. It is native to west and west-central wet tropical Africa. A large tree reaching 55 m (180 ft), it is found in a variety of forest types at elevations from 600 to 1,200 m (2,000 to 3,900 ft). It has been assessed as Least Concern.
