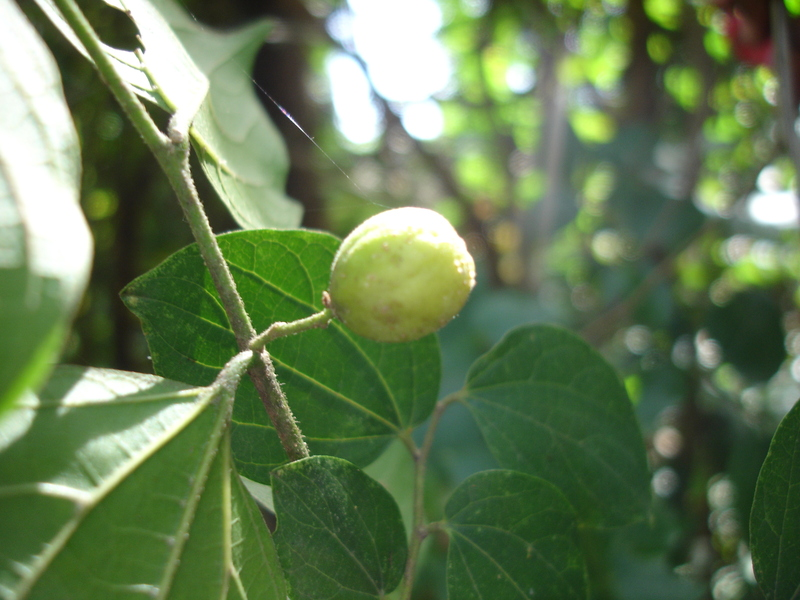

Scientific classification
- Kingdom: Plantae
- Clade: Tracheophytes
- Clade: Angiosperms
- Clade: Eudicots
- Clade: Rosids
- Order: Rosales
- Family: Cannabaceae
- Genus: Celtis
- Species: C. toka

Binomial name
- Celtis toka (Forssk.) Hepper & J.R.I.Wood

= Celtis toka =

Species of plant

Celtis toka is a medium-sized tree that commonly occurs adjacent to streams and rivers in the Sudanian-Sahel savannah climates of Tropical Africa but it can survive in drier habitats; it is also found of Yemen and Saudi Arabia.

== Description ==
Tree is capable of growing up to 25 metres (82 ft) tall, the trunk is usually cylindrical with a fairly compact crown, the bark is light grey and smooth with narrow buttressed roots, brown patches left when thin scales defoliates from bark. Leaves are simple in arrangement with a coriaceous and scabrid surface, the stipules is 4–5 mm long and it is pubescent; the leaf-blade is broadly ovate in outline, about 5–7 cm long and 2–4 cm wide, the apex is acuminate to rounded and the base is cordate, the petiole is 4–6 mm long; margin entire, the stomata is unequalled cell type, meaning it is anisocytic. Yellow-green flowers are in axillary cymes. The fruits is a globular drupe, 8–11 mm long with an endocarp that is greyish in color and ovoid in shape

== Distribution ==
Occurs in savannah regions, from Senegal to Sudan in Africa and also occurs in Yemen.
