= Celtis madagascariensis =

Conservation status
- Least Concern (IUCN 3.1)

Scientific classification
- Kingdom: Plantae
- Clade: Tracheophytes
- Clade: Angiosperms
- Clade: Eudicots
- Clade: Rosids
- Order: Rosales
- Family: Cannabaceae
- Genus: Celtis
- Species: C. madagascariensis

Binomial name
- Celtis madagascariensis Sattarian

Synonyms
- Celtis malagasica Sattarian

Species of plant

Celtis madagascariensis is a species of flowering plant endemic to Madagascar.

== Description ==
Celtis madagascariensis is a small deciduous tree, growing 7 to 10 meters high. Its bark is smooth and whitish to grey. Its leaves are alternate, simple, and ovate-elliptic, 7 – 10 cm wide by 2.5 – 3 cm wide.

Male and hermaphrodite flowers creamy with a tender glabrous pedicel, 3 to 5 mm long, with 5 glabrous sepals and 5 stamens. They are borne on axillary inflorescences, as long as or longer than the petiole, lower ones with only male flowers or with male flowers and 1 or 2 hermaphrodite flowers, and upper ones sometimes without male flowers and 2 to 5 hermaphrodite flowers. The fruit is a drupe, green becoming red or brown and broadly ellipsoid, c. 12 x 8 mm, bearing a single seed.

== Range and habitat ==
Celtis madagascariensis is widespread in northern, western and southwestern Madagascar. It lives along forest margins, up to 1,200 meters elevation.
