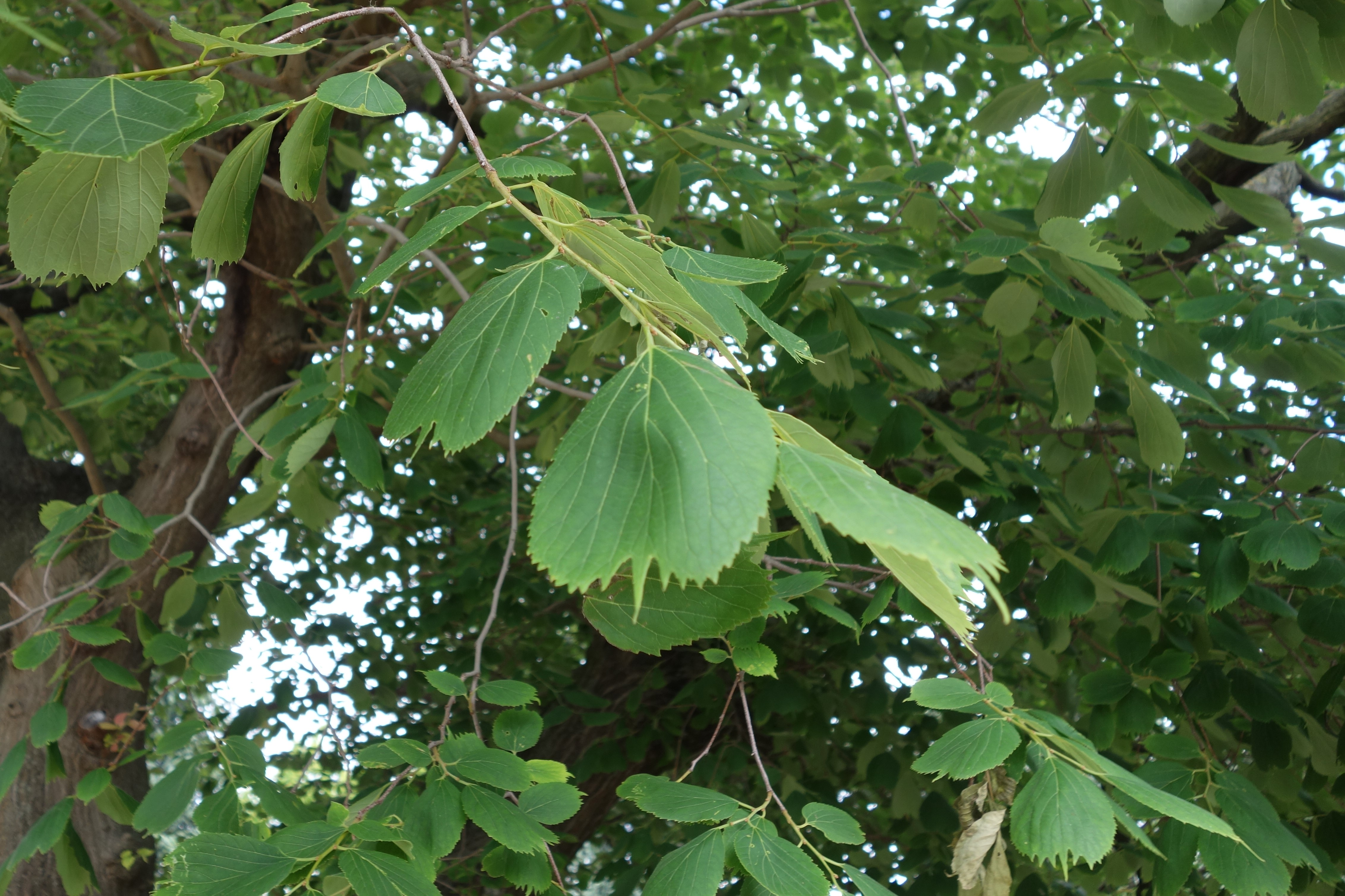

Scientific classification
- Kingdom: Plantae
- Clade: Tracheophytes
- Clade: Angiosperms
- Clade: Eudicots
- Clade: Rosids
- Order: Rosales
- Family: Cannabaceae
- Genus: Celtis
- Species: C. koraiensis

Binomial name
- Celtis koraiensis Nakai

Synonyms
- Celtis aurantiaca Nakai 1930

= Celtis koraiensis =

Korean hackberry

Species of flowering plant

Celtis koraiensis, commonly known as the Korean hackberry, is a deciduous tree in the genus Celtis. The species is endemic to the Korean Peninsula and the north of China. It is typically found in altitudes of 100 to 1,500 metres (330 to 4,920 ft).

The tree flowers from April to May, and the fruit ripens from September to October. It can grow up to 15 metres (49 ft) in height.

== Seed Dormancy ==
Once the seeds of Celtis koraiensis go dormant, a process of cold stratification along with the addition of Gibberellic Acid (GA(3)) can be done to germinate the seeds. Seeds were able to germinate to a maximum of 45.2% under the conditions of 400 mg GA(3) alternating 4/15 degrees C.
