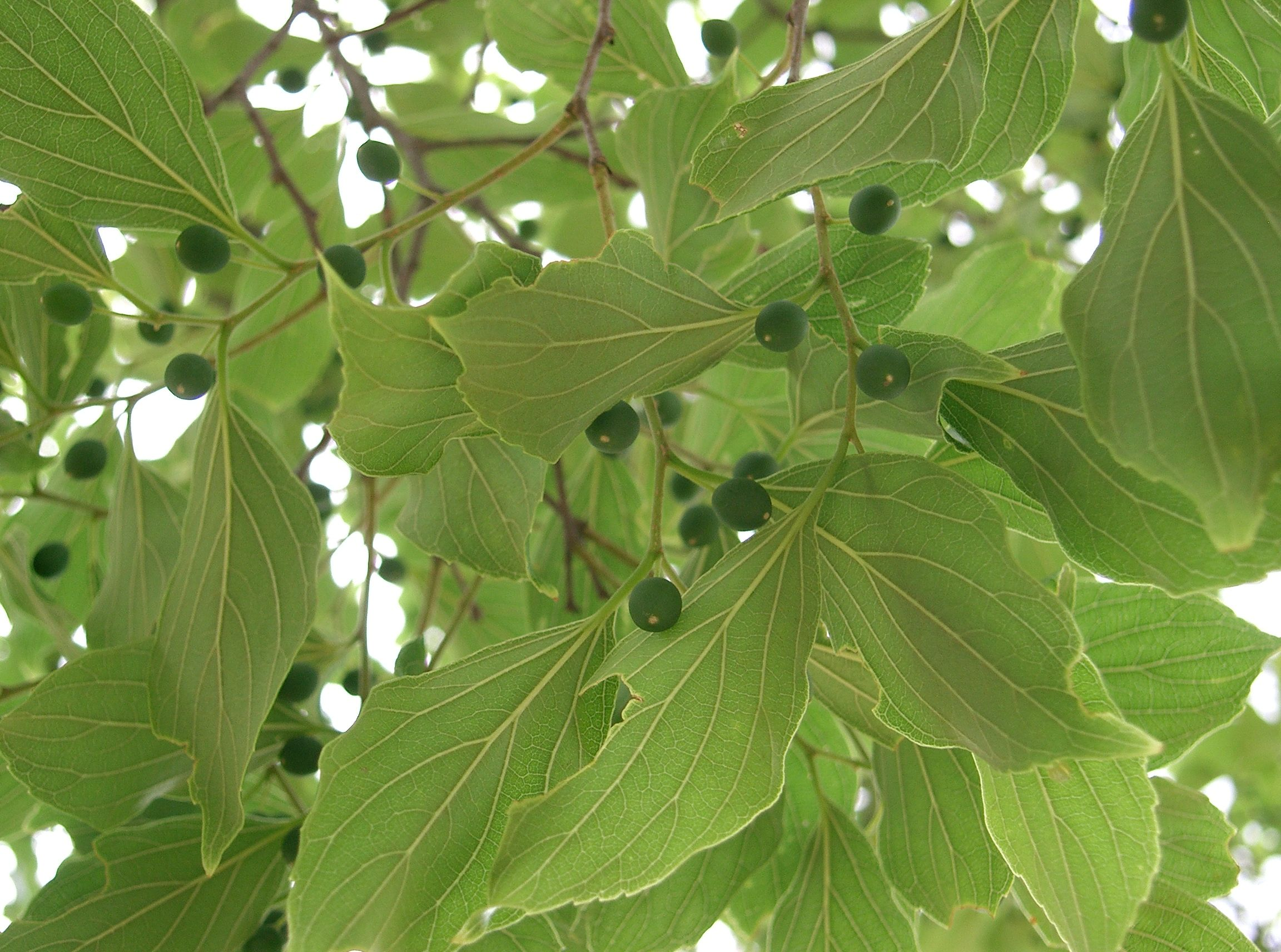

Scientific classification
- Kingdom: Plantae
- Clade: Tracheophytes
- Clade: Angiosperms
- Clade: Eudicots
- Clade: Rosids
- Order: Rosales
- Family: Cannabaceae
- Genus: Celtis
- Species: C. jessoensis

Binomial name
- Celtis jessoensis Koidz.

= Celtis jessoensis =

Species of tree

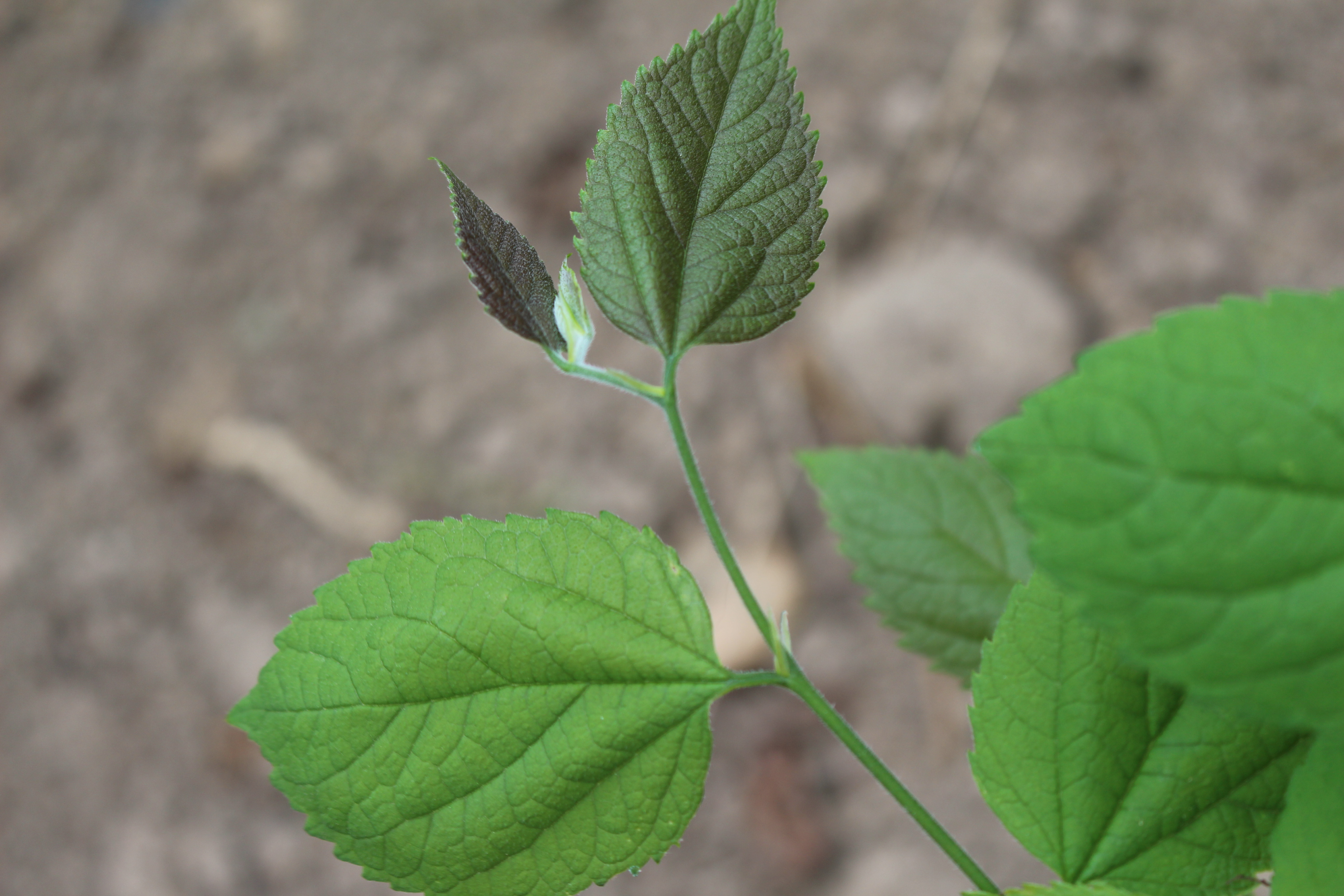
New growth

Celtis jessoensis, known as the Japanese hackberry or Jesso hackberry (from an archaic reading of "Ezo": Hokkaidō), is a species of hackberry native to Japan and Korea. It is a deciduous tree growing to 20–25 m (66–82 ft) tall. The leaves are 5–9 cm (2.0–3.5 in) long and 3–4 cm (1.2–1.6 in) broad, with a sharply serrated margin, glaucous beneath and downy on the leaf veins.

== See also ==
- Great purple emperor
