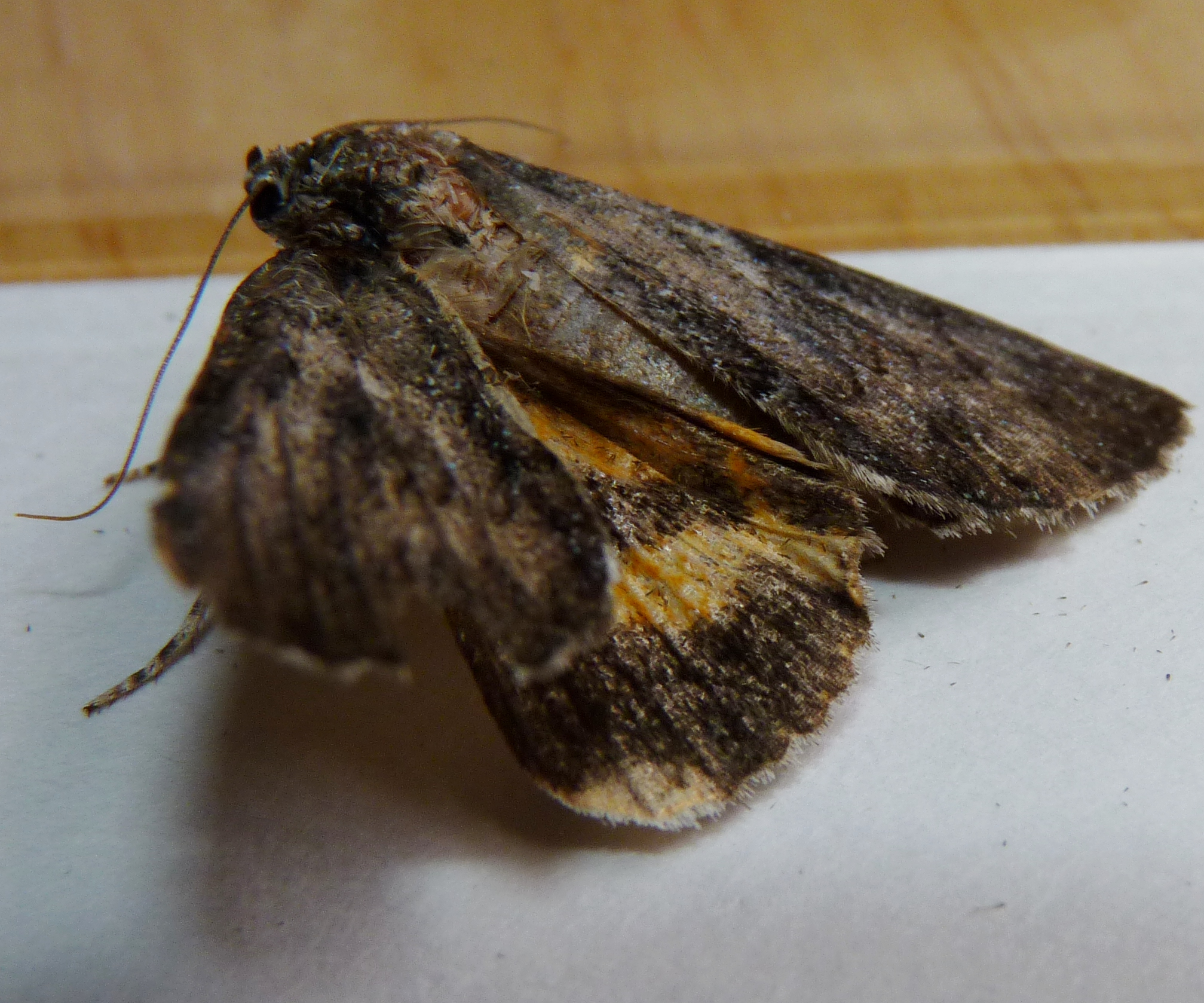

Scientific classification
- Kingdom: Animalia
- Phylum: Arthropoda
- Class: Insecta
- Order: Lepidoptera
- Superfamily: Noctuoidea
- Family: Erebidae
- Genus: Catocala
- Species: C. sordida

Binomial name
- Catocala sordida Grote, 1877

Synonyms
- Catocala engelhardti Lemmer, 1937; Catocala sordida f. metalomus; Catocala gracilis sordida

= Catocala sordida =

Species of moth

Catocala sordida, the sordid underwing, is a moth of the family Erebidae. The species was first described by Augustus Radcliffe Grote in 1877. It is found in North America from Saskatchewan east to New Brunswick and Prince Edward Island and south through Maine and Connecticut to Florida, west to Texas and north to Manitoba.

The wingspan is 37–45 mm. Adults are on wing from May to September. There is one generation per year.

The larvae feed on Celtis and Vaccinium.
