= Celtis luzonica =

Conservation status
- Vulnerable (IUCN 2.3)

Scientific classification
- Kingdom: Plantae
- Clade: Tracheophytes
- Clade: Angiosperms
- Clade: Eudicots
- Clade: Rosids
- Order: Rosales
- Family: Cannabaceae
- Genus: Celtis
- Species: C. luzonica

Binomial name
- Celtis luzonica Warb.

Species of flowering plant

Celtis luzonica is a species of plant in the family Cannabaceae. It is endemic to the Philippines. It is threatened by habitat loss.
