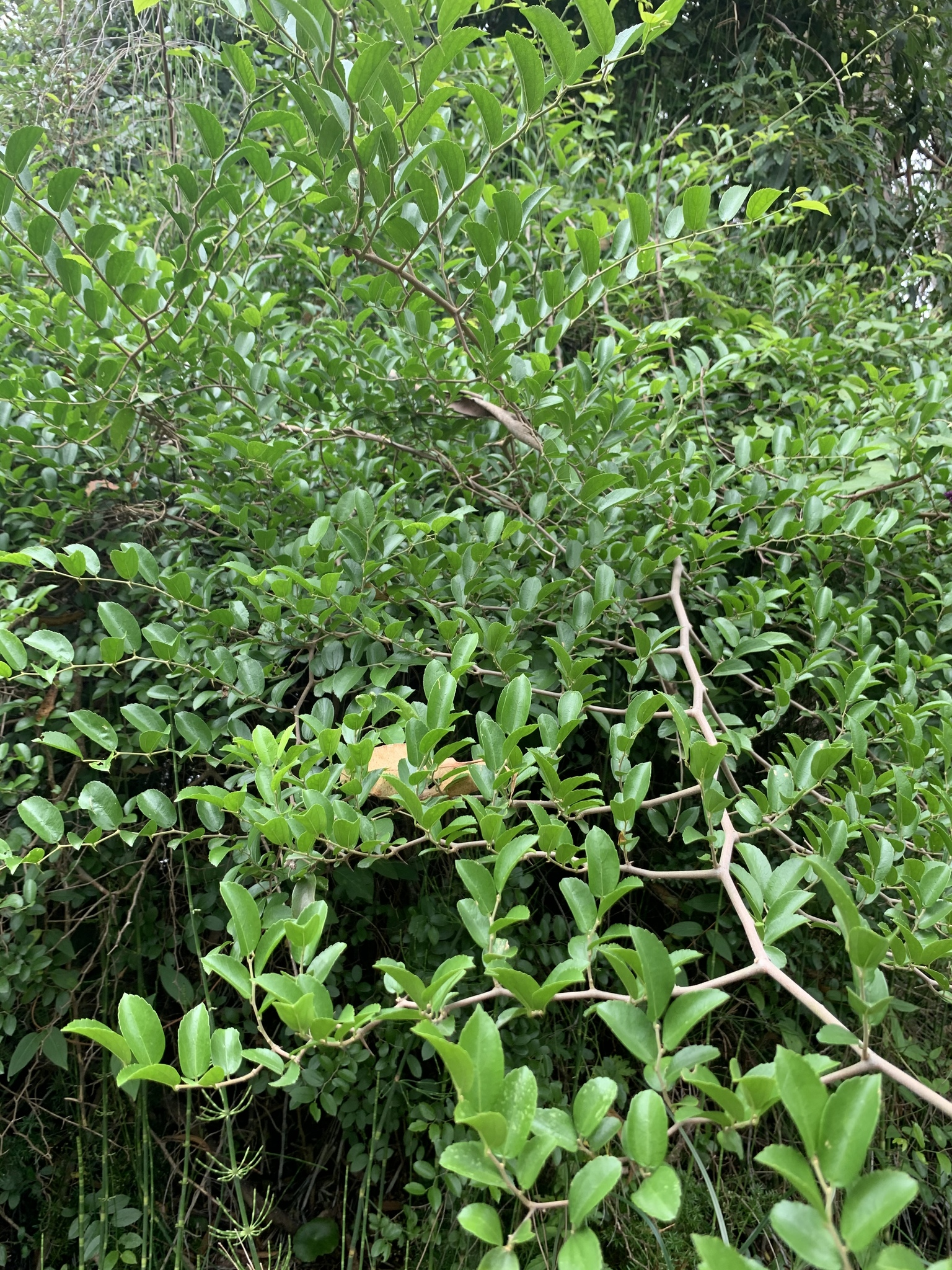

Conservation status
- Least Concern (IUCN 3.1)

Scientific classification
- Kingdom: Plantae
- Clade: Tracheophytes
- Clade: Angiosperms
- Clade: Eudicots
- Clade: Rosids
- Order: Rosales
- Family: Cannabaceae
- Genus: Celtis
- Species: C. iguanaea

Binomial name
- Celtis iguanaea (Jacq.) Sarg.

Synonyms
- List: Celtidopsis citrifolia (Kunth) Priemer; Celtis aculeata Sw.; Celtis anfractuosa Liebm.; Celtis asperula Miq.; Celtis biflora Ruiz ex Miq.; Celtis brevifolia (Klotzsch) Miq.; Celtis dichotoma (Klotzsch) Ruiz ex Miq.; Celtis diffusa Planch.; Celtis ehrenbergiana (Klotzsch) Liebm.; Celtis epiphylladena Ortega; Celtis eriantha E.Mey. ex Planch.; Celtis gardneri Planch.; Celtis glabrata Spreng.; Celtis glycycarpa Mart. ex Miq.; Celtis goudotii Planch.; Celtis hilariana Planch.; Celtis laevigata (Kunth) Spreng. nom. illeg.; Celtis membranacea (Wedd.) Miq.; Celtis morifolia Planch. nom. illeg.; Celtis pavonii Planch.; Celtis platycaulis Greenm.; Celtis pubescens (Kunth) Spreng.; Celtis rhamnoides Willd. nom. illeg.; Celtis spinosa Ruiz ex Miq.; Celtis spinosissima (Wedd.) Miq.; Celtis triflora (Klotzsch) Ruiz ex Miq.; Celtis velutina Planch.; Celtis williamsii Rusby; Celtis zizyphoides (Kunth) Spreng.; Mertensia aculeata (Sw.) Schult.; Mertensia citrifolia Kunth; Mertensia iguanea (Jacq.) Schult.; Mertensia rhamnoides (Willd.) Schult.; Mertensia zizyphoides Kunth; Momisia aculeata (Sw.) Klotzsch; Momisia alnifolia Wedd.; Momisia anfractuosa (Liebm.) Rose & Standl.; Momisia brevifolia Klotzsch; Momisia dichotoma Klotzsch; Momisia ehrenbergiana Klotzsch; Momisia iguanaea (Jacq.) Rose & Standl.; Momisia laevigata F. Dietr.; Momisia lancifolia Wedd.; Momisia membranacea Wedd.; Momisia pallida (Torr.) Planch.; Momisia platycaulis (Greenm.) Rose & Standl.; Momisia spinosissima Wedd.; Momisia tarijensis Wedd.; Momisia triflora Klotzsch; Momisia zizyphoides (Kunth) F. Dietr.; Rhamnus iguanaea Jacq.; Sarcomphalus punctatus Urb. & Ekman; Ziziphus iguanea (Jacq.) Lam.

= Celtis iguanaea =

Species of plant

Celtis iguanaea, the iguana hackberry, is a deciduous tree in the genus Celtis.

The species is found in the United States (Florida), Central America, the Caribbean, and South America.
