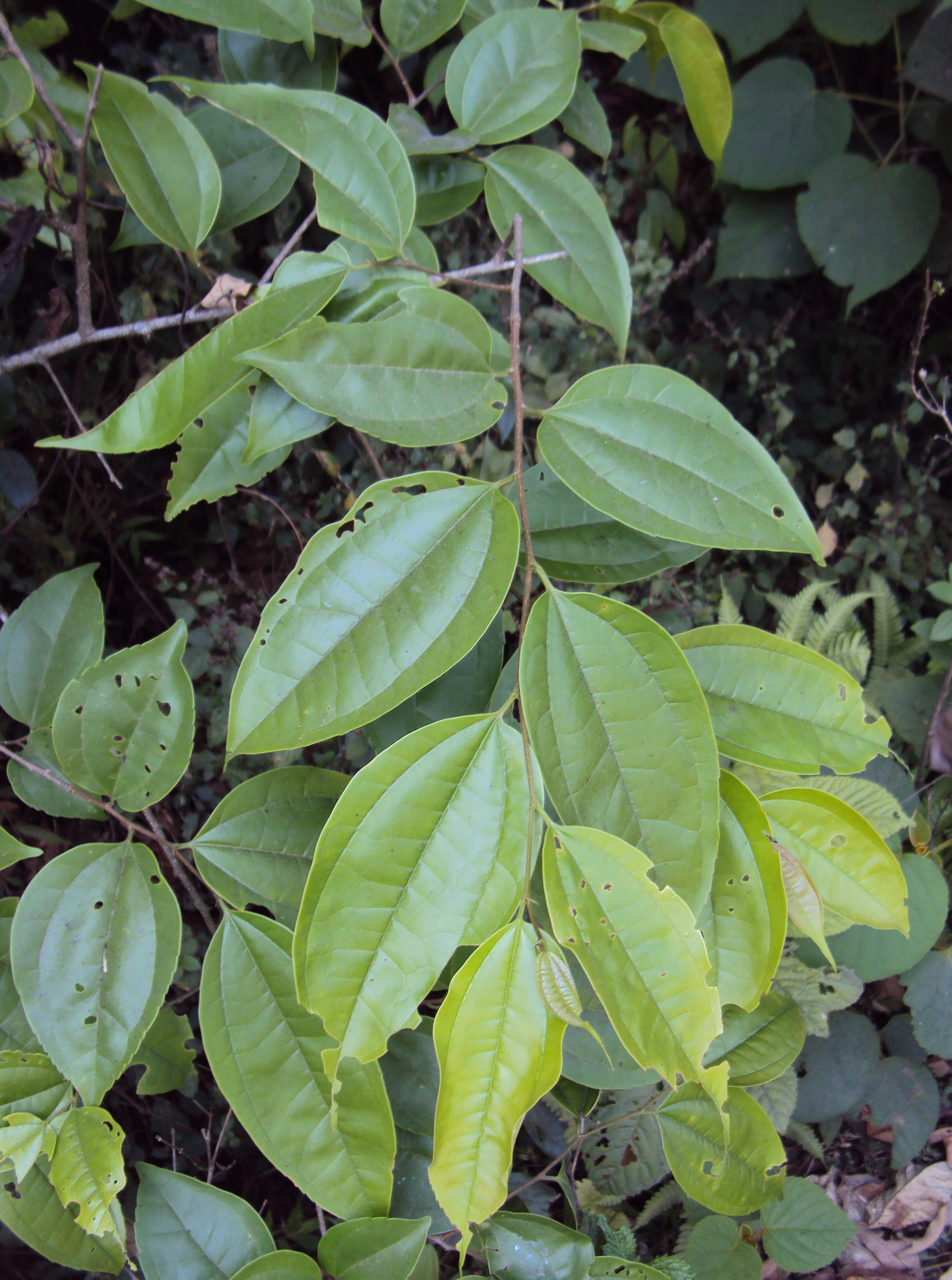

Conservation status
- Least Concern (IUCN 3.1)

Scientific classification
- Kingdom: Plantae
- Clade: Tracheophytes
- Clade: Angiosperms
- Clade: Eudicots
- Clade: Rosids
- Order: Rosales
- Family: Cannabaceae
- Genus: Celtis
- Species: C. timorensis

Binomial name
- Celtis timorensis Span. (1841)

Synonyms
- Celtis cinnamomea Lindl. ex Planch. (1848); Celtis crenatoserrata Merr. (1910); Celtis dysodoxylon Thwaites (1861); Celtis hamata Blume (1856); Celtis reticulosa Miq. (1851); Celtis waitzii Blume (1856); Sponia pendula Span. (1841)

= Celtis timorensis =

Species of tree

Celtis timorensis, commonly known as stinkwood or stinking wood, is a species of flowering plant in the family Cannabaceae that grows in tropical Asia. The specific epithet comes from the name of the island of Timor, the locality of the type collection. The most notable characteristic of the tree is the strong excrement odour that it emits from the bark and sap, which pervades the surrounding forest. This is due to the presence of the malodorous organic compound skatole. In Thailand, it therefore known as kæ̂ng k̄hī̂ phrar̀wng or mị̂ chĕd tūd phrar̀wng (Thai: แก้งขี้พระร่วง, ไม้เช็ดตูดพระร่วง) which means 'wipe the bottom timber'. Thai legend has it that Phra Ruang (the legendary King of the Sukhothai dynasty) wiped his buttocks with it. In Sri Lanka the heartwood of the tree (known as gurenda, ගුරෙන්ද) is used as a traditional ayurvedic medicine against syphilis, chickenpox, and measles.

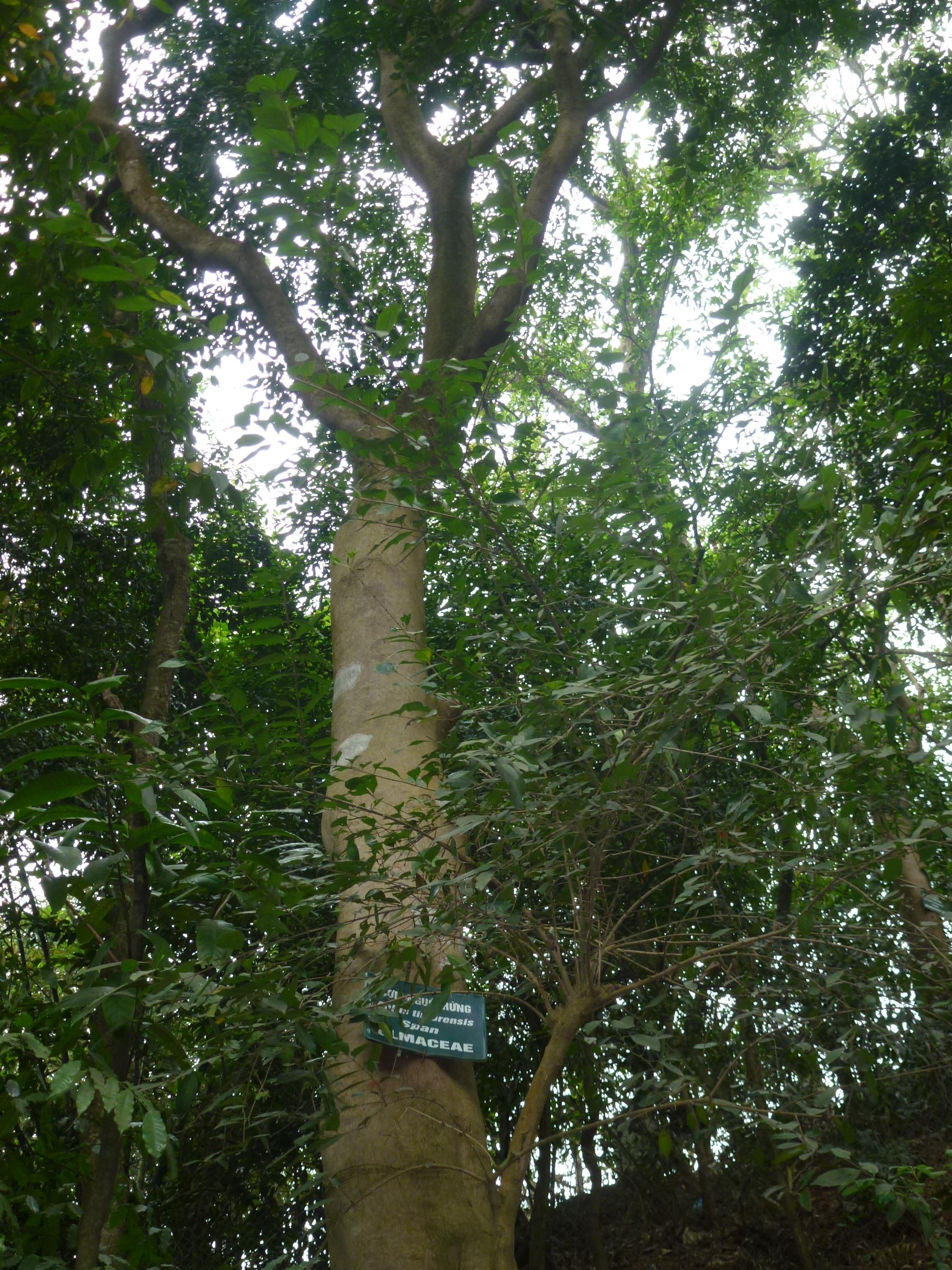
At Hùng Temple, Vietnam

== Description ==
Celtis timorensis is a large forest tree growing to 25 m in height. The wood and sap have a strong foetid smell that resembles excrement because of the presence of skatole. The oblate to oblong, strongly 3-veined leaves are 50–130 mm in length. Although the tree resembles Cinnamomum iners in its 3-veined leaves, it can easily be distinguished by its serrated leaf margins. The seed, protected by the 7–11 mm long fruit's hard and durable endocarp, is dispersed by water. Flowers - Inflorescence - male greenish, short racemose cymes; female more slender axillary or terminal cymes.
Fruits - beaked, pear-shaped drupe.

== Distribution and habitat ==
The tree is found throughout the tropical regions of Asia, from India and Sri Lanka, through Indo-China, southern China and Malesia to the Philippines. It occurs on Christmas Island, an Australian territory in the northeastern Indian Ocean, where it forms about 1% of the primary rainforest canopy. It grows in drier, seasonal rain forest.
