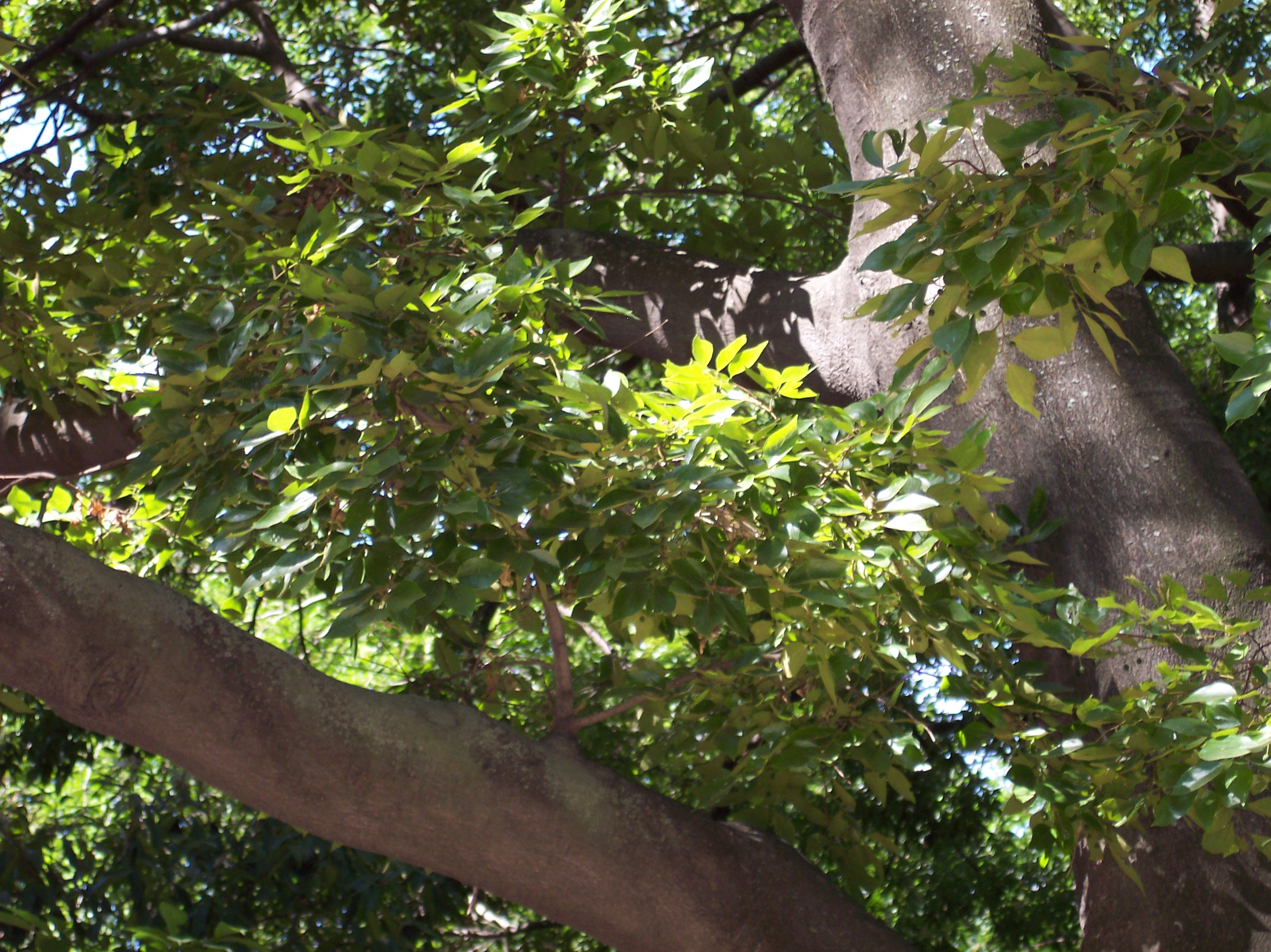

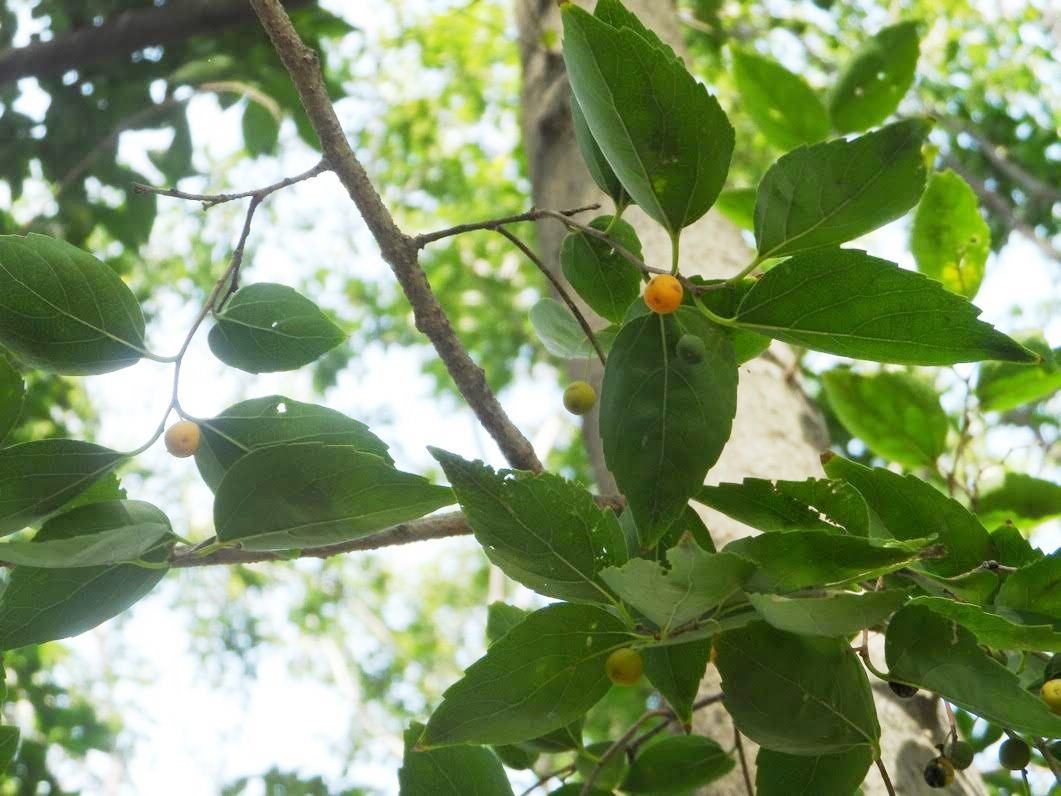

Scientific classification
- Kingdom: Plantae
- Clade: Tracheophytes
- Clade: Angiosperms
- Clade: Eudicots
- Clade: Rosids
- Order: Rosales
- Family: Cannabaceae
- Genus: Celtis
- Species: C. bungeana

Binomial name
- Celtis bungeana Blume

= Celtis bungeana =

Bunge's hackberry

Species of flowering plant

Celtis bungeana, commonly known as Bunge's hackberry, is a deciduous tree in the genus Celtis that can grow 15 meters in height.

== Range ==
The species is native to the temperate zone of Asia in China and Korea.

== Flowers and fruit ==
The tree flowers from April to May, and the fruit ripens from October to November.
