= Celtis mauritiana =

Scientific classification
- Kingdom: Plantae
- Clade: Tracheophytes
- Clade: Angiosperms
- Clade: Eudicots
- Clade: Rosids
- Order: Rosales
- Family: Cannabaceae
- Genus: Celtis
- Species: C. mauritiana

Binomial name
- Celtis mauritiana Planch.

Synonyms
- Celtis brownii Rendle; Celtis insularis Rendle; Celtis prantlii Priemer; Celtis prantlii f. parvifolia Hauman; Celtis rendleana G.Taylor; Celtis scotellioides A.Chev.; Solenostigma mauritianum (Planch.)

Species of flowering plant

Celtis mauritiana is a species of flowering plant native to Sub-Saharan Africa, Madagascar, the Comoro Islands, and Mauritius.

== Range and habitat ==
Celtis mauritiana ranges across much of Sub-Saharan Africa, from Senegal in the west to Ethiopia in the east, and south to Mozambique and Angola. It is also native to Madagascar, the Comoro Islands, and Mauritius in the western Indian Ocean.
