= Celtis zenkeri =

Conservation status
- Least Concern (IUCN 3.1)

Scientific classification
- Kingdom: Plantae
- Clade: Tracheophytes
- Clade: Angiosperms
- Clade: Eudicots
- Clade: Rosids
- Order: Rosales
- Family: Cannabaceae
- Genus: Celtis
- Species: C. zenkeri

Binomial name
- Celtis zenkeri Engl. (1902)

Synonyms
- Celtis affinis De Wild. (1921); Celtis soyauxii Engl. (1902); Celtis stuhlmannii Engl. (1902)

Species of plant

Celtis zenkeri is a species of flowering plant native to sub-Saharan Africa.

== Description ==
Celtis zenkeri is a large tree, growing up to 30–50 metres (98–164 ft) high. It is fast-growing, growing up to 15 cm (5.9 in) in height per year, and in Côte d’Ivoire its trunk can grow 0.5 to 1 cm in diameter per year. It flowers from February to April in Nigeria, and in March, August and September in Ghana.

== Range and habitat ==
Celtis zenkeri ranges across western, central and eastern Africa south of the Sahara, from Guinea in the west to Ethiopia in the east, and south to Angola and Tanzania. The species' estimated extent of occurrence (EOO) is 8,542,025 km^{2} (3,298,094 sq mi).

It grows in deciduous and semi-deciduous forests, savanna woodlands, and rainforest.

== Ecology ==
The tree's seeds are dispersed by birds and primates which eat the fruits.
