= Celtis spinosa =

Scientific classification
- Kingdom: Plantae
- Clade: Tracheophytes
- Clade: Angiosperms
- Clade: Eudicots
- Clade: Rosids
- Order: Rosales
- Family: Cannabaceae
- Genus: Celtis
- Species: C. spinosa

Binomial name
- Celtis spinosa Spreng.

Species of plant

Celtis spinosa is a species of flowering plant in the family Cannabaceae, native to seasonally dry tropical South America. It is a shrub typically 2.5 to 5 m (8 to 16 ft) tall, with yellowish-green flowers.
