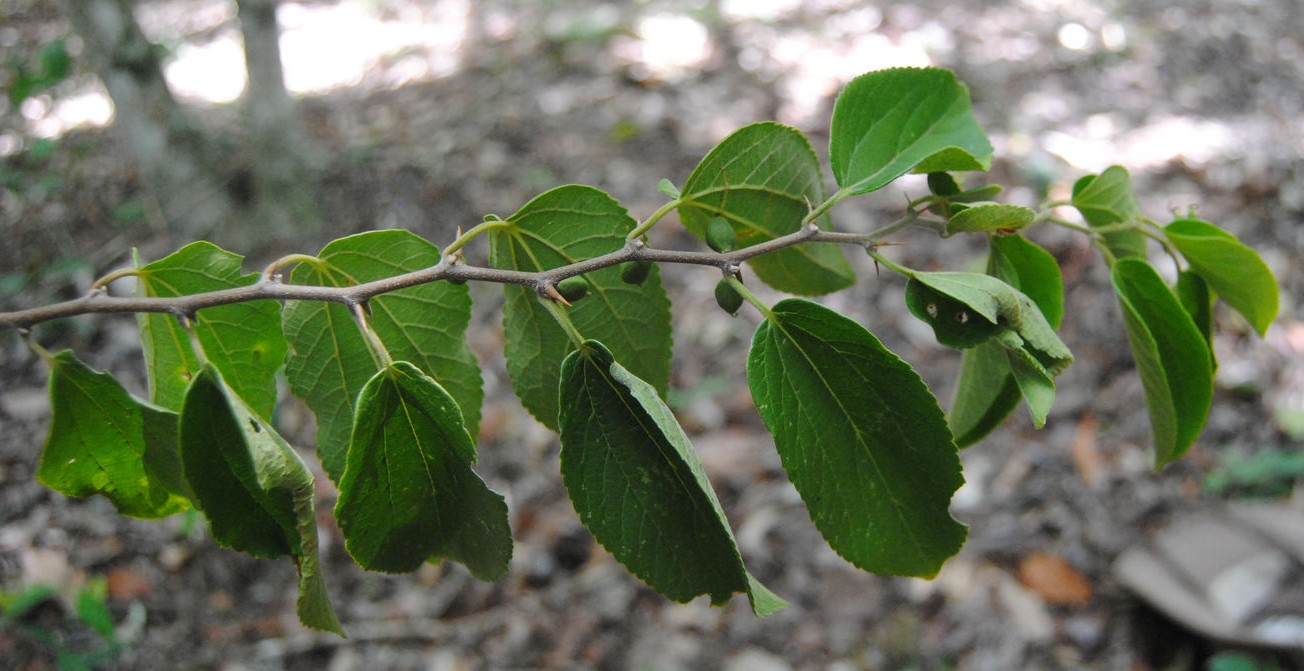

Conservation status
- Least Concern (IUCN 3.1)

Scientific classification
- Kingdom: Plantae
- Clade: Embryophytes
- Clade: Tracheophytes
- Clade: Spermatophytes
- Clade: Angiosperms
- Clade: Eudicots
- Clade: Rosids
- Order: Rosales
- Family: Cannabaceae
- Genus: Celtis
- Species: C. brasiliensis

Binomial name
- Celtis brasiliensis (Gardner) Planch

Synonyms
- Synonymy: Mertensia brasiliensis Planch.; Celtis boliviensis Planch.; Celtis crenata (Wedd.) Miq.; Celtis dumosa Casar. ex Planch.; Celtis flagellaris Casar. ex Planch.; Celtis flexuosa (Wedd.) Miq.; Celtis fuscata Rojas Acosta; Celtis lanceolata Parodi; Celtis membranacea (Wedd.) Miq.; Celtis rhamnoides DC. ex Planch.; Momisia crenata Wedd.; Momisia flexuosa Wedd.; Momisia membranacea Wedd.

= Celtis brasiliensis =

Species of South American tree

Celtis brasiliensis, also known as the Brazilian hackberry, is a deciduous tree or scrambling shrub in the Cannabaceae family native to South America. It can reach a height of 1.5–10 m (4 ft 11 in – 32 ft 10 in).
