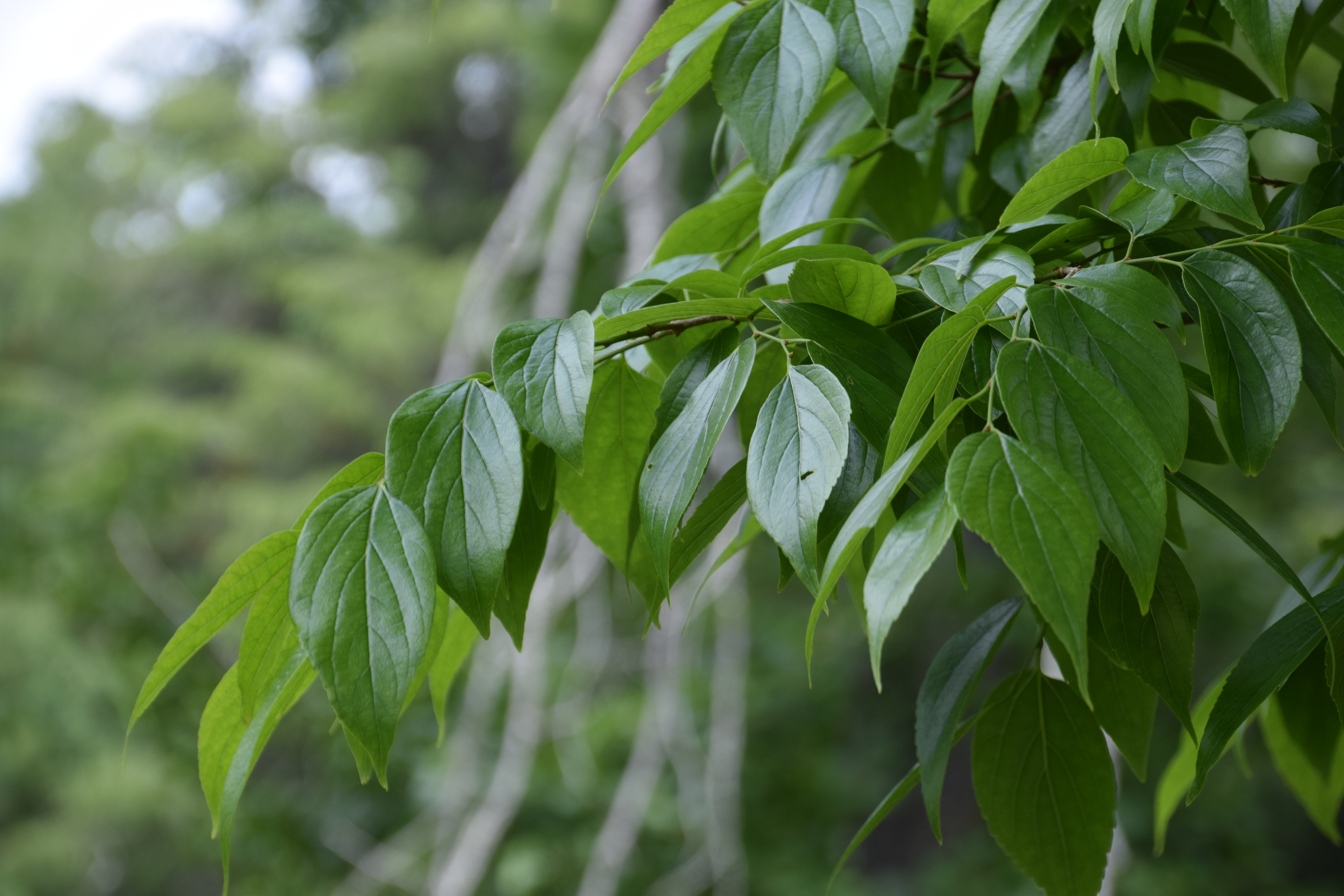
- At Eastwoodhill Arboretum

Scientific classification
- Kingdom: Plantae
- Clade: Embryophytes
- Clade: Tracheophytes
- Clade: Spermatophytes
- Clade: Angiosperms
- Clade: Eudicots
- Clade: Rosids
- Order: Rosales
- Family: Cannabaceae
- Genus: Celtis
- Species: C. tetrandra

Binomial name
- Celtis tetrandra Roxb.

Synonyms
- List: Celtis acata Buch.-Ham.; Celtis alpina Royle; Celtis fengqingensis Hu ex E.W.Ma; Celtis formosana Hayata; Celtis glabra Planch.; Celtis hamiltonii Planch.; Celtis kunmingensis C.C.Cheng & D.Y.Hong; Celtis napalensis Planch.; Celtis roxburghii Planch.; Celtis salvatiana C.K.Schneid.; Celtis serotina Planch.; Celtis sinensis var. tetrandra (Roxb.) F.Y.Lu, C.H.Ou, Y.T.Chen, Y.S.Chi, K.C.Lu & Y.H.Tseng; Celtis tetrandra f. pendula Y.Q.Zhu; Celtis trinervia Roxb.; Celtis wallichii Steud.; Celtis xizangensis E.W.Ma; Celtis yunnanensis C.K.Schneid.; Sponia tetrandra Voigt

= Celtis tetrandra =

Species of flowering plant

Celtis tetrandra, called the Nilgiri elm, is a species of flowering plant in the hackberry genus Celtis, family Cannabaceae. It is widely distributed across the Indian Subcontinent, southern China, Southeast Asia, and western Indonesia. It is occasionally available commercially.
