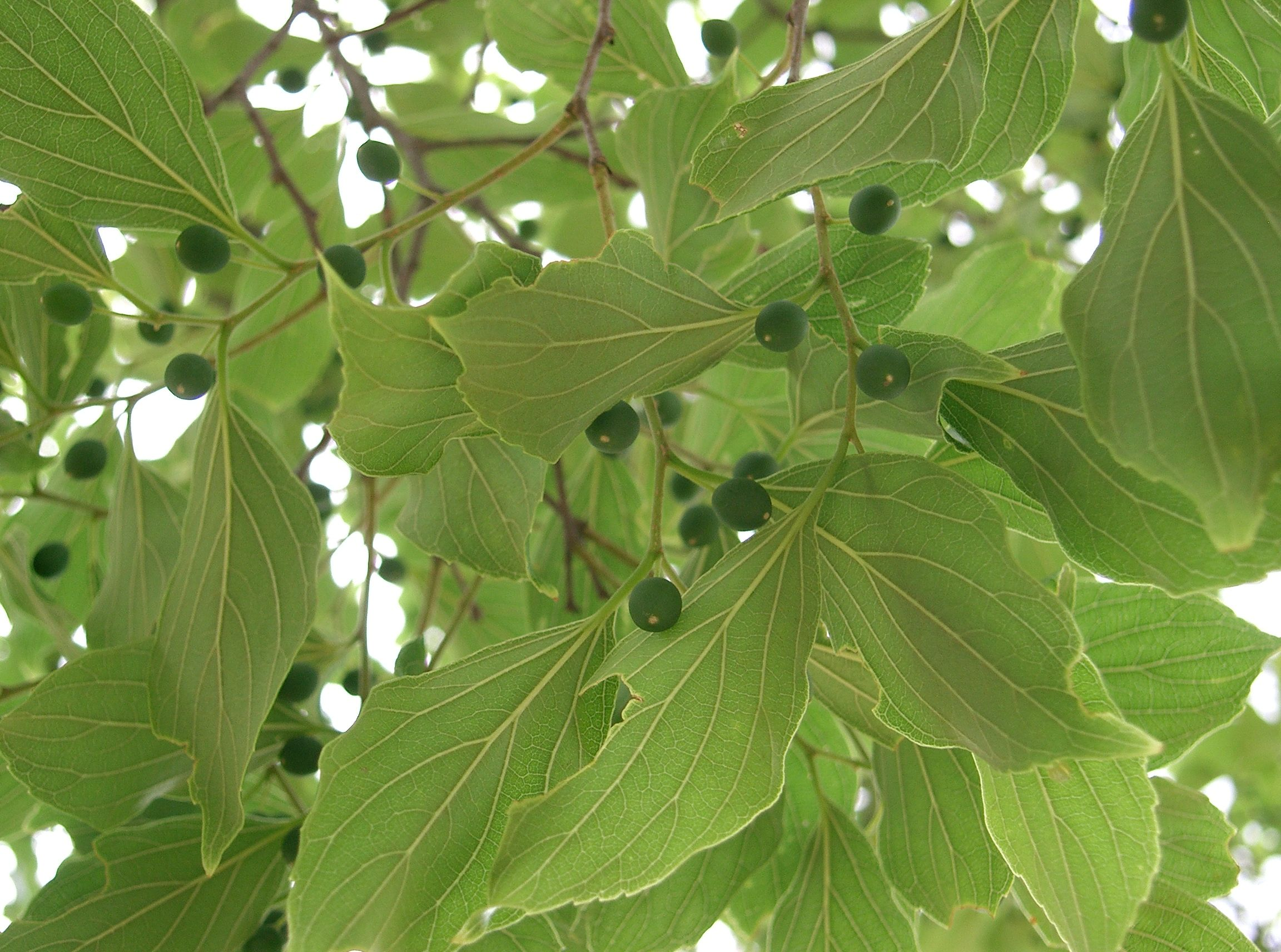
- Leaves and immature fruit of Chinese hackberry (C. sinensis)

Scientific classification
- Kingdom: Plantae
- Clade: Tracheophytes
- Clade: Angiosperms
- Clade: Eudicots
- Clade: Rosids
- Order: Rosales
- Family: Cannabaceae
- Genus: Celtis; L.

Species
- Some 60–70 (see below)

Synonyms
- Celtidopsis Priemer; Colletia Scop.; Mertensia Kunth; Momisia F.Dietr.; Plagioceltis Mildbr. ex Baehni; Saurobroma Raf.; Solenostigma Endl.

= Celtis =

Genus of plants

Celtis is a genus of about 60–70 species of deciduous trees, commonly known as hackberries or nettle trees, in the hemp family Cannabaceae. It has a cosmopolitan distribution.

== Description ==
Celtis species are generally medium-sized trees, reaching 10–25 metres (33–82 feet) tall, rarely up to 40 m (130 ft) tall. The leaves are alternate, simple, 3–15 centimetres (1 1/4–6 inches) long, ovate-acuminate, and evenly serrated margins. Diagnostically, Celtis can be very similar to trees in the Rosaceae and other rose motif families.

Small flowers of this monoecious plant appear in early spring while the leaves are still developing. Male flowers are longer and hairy. Female flowers are greenish and more rounded.

The fruit is a small drupe 6–10 millimetres (1/4–3/8 in) in diameter, edible in many species, with a dryish but sweet, sugary consistency, reminiscent of a date.

== Taxonomy ==
Previously included either in the elm family (Ulmaceae) or a separate family, Celtidaceae, the APG III system places Celtis in an expanded hemp family (Cannabaceae).

=== Phylogeny ===
Members of the genus are present in the fossil record as early as the Miocene of Europe, and Paleocene of North America and eastern Asia.

=== Etymology ===
The derivation of the name of this genus, Celtis, is from a Latin word for an unrelated plant, the "lotus tree" of North Africa. The word was applied to this taxon by Linnaeus for unknown reasons.

=== Species ===
As of July 2024, the following 68 species are accepted by Plants of the World Online.

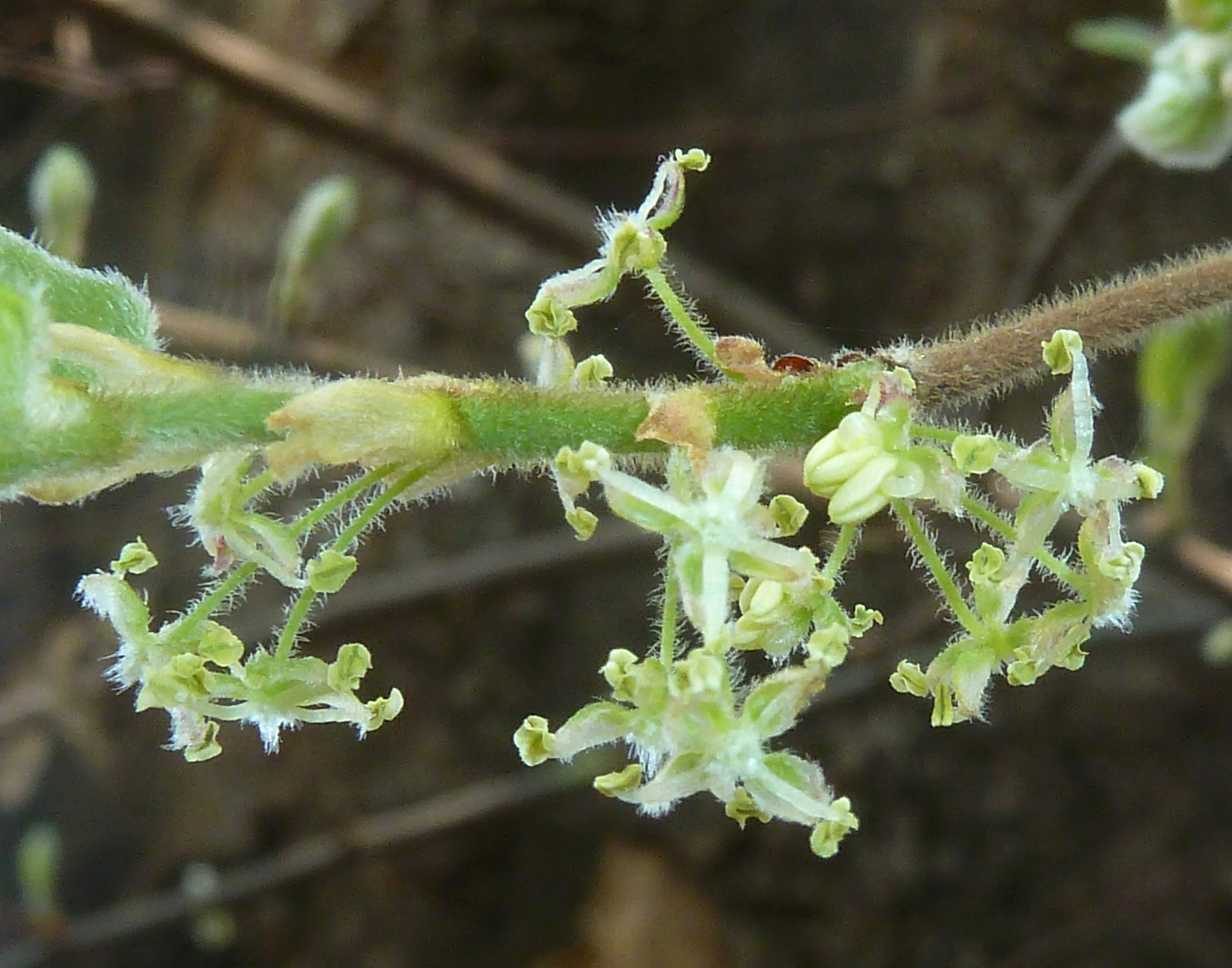
Clusters of staminate (male) flowers of C. africana, with four tepals and four stamens each

- Celtis adolfi-friderici Engl. – western and central Africa
- Celtis africana Burm.f. – Afromontane region, Madagascar
- Celtis australis L. – Mediterranean Basin
- Celtis balansae Planch. – New Caledonia
- Celtis berteroana Urb. – Cuba, Hispaniola, Jamaica
- Celtis bifida Leroy – Madagascar
- Celtis biondii Pamp. – China, Korea, Japan, Taiwan
- Celtis boninensis Koidz. – Japan
- Celtis brasiliensis (Gardner) Planch. – South America
- Celtis bungeana L. – China, Korea
- Celtis caucasica L. – Turkey, Central Asia to Assam
- Celtis caudata Planch. – Mexico and Central America
- Celtis cerasifera C.K.Schneid. – central and southern China, southeastern Tibet, and northern Myanmar
- Celtis chekiangensis C.C.Cheng – eastern China
- Celtis chichape (Wedd.) Miq. – Bolivia, Paraguay, Uruguay, northern Argentina, and southern Brazil
- Celtis clausseniana Wedd. Miq. – Brazil
- Celtis conferta Planch. – New Caledonia
- Celtis eriocarpa Decne. – Pakistan, western Himalaya
- Celtis flavovenarum Zamengo – Brazil
- Celtis flumeniana Zamengo – Brazil
- Celtis fluminensis Carauta – Brazil
- Celtis glabrata Steven ex Planch. – eastern Europe and western Asia
- Celtis harperi Horne ex Baker – SW Pacific
- Celtis hildebrandii Soepadmo – Maluku to Solomon Islands
- Celtis hypoleuca Planch. – New Caledonia
- Celtis iguanaea (Jacq.) Sarg. – Florida, Mexico, Caribbean, Central and South America
- Celtis jamaicensis Planch. – Jamaica
- Celtis jessoensis Koidz. – Japan and Korea
- Celtis julianae C.K.Schneid. – China
- Celtis koraiensis L. – E. China to Korea
- Celtis laevigata Willd. – central and southeast US, Mexico
- Celtis latifolia (Blume) Planch. – Philippines, Maluku to Santa Cruz Islands
- Celtis lindheimeri Engelm. ex K.Koch – Texas, Mexico
- Celtis loxensis C.C.Berg – Ecuador, N. Peru
- Celtis luzonica Warb. – Philippines
- Celtis madagascariensis Sattarian – Madagascar
- Celtis mauritiana Planch. – tropical Africa and western Indian Ocean
- Celtis mildbraedii Engl. – tropical Africa and Madagascar
- Celtis neglecta Zi L.Chen & X.F.Jin – China (Zhejiang)
- Celtis occidentalis L. – eastern North America
- Celtis orthocanthos Planch. – Brazil
- Celtis pacifica Planch. – south central Pacific
- Celtis pallida Torr. – southwestern US, northern Mexico
- Celtis paniculata (Endl.) Planch. – eastern Malesia, eastern Australia, Micronesia, western Polynesia
- Celtis petenensis Lundell – Guatemala
- Celtis philippensis Planch. – tropical and subtropical Asia to N. Australia
- Celtis prantlii Priemer ex Engl. – west and central tropical Africa
- Celtis punctata (Urb. & Ekman) Urb. & Ekman – Haiti
- Celtis reticulata Torr. – western North America
- Celtis rigescens (Miq.) Planch. – Malesia, Papuasia
- Celtis rubrovenia Elmer – Philippines, Papuasia
- Celtis salomonensis Rech. – Solomon Islands
- Celtis serratissima Zamengo, R.B.Torres, Gaglioti & Romaniuc – Brazil
- Celtis sinensis Pers. – China and Japan
- Celtis spinosa Spreng. – Argentina, Bolivia, Brazil, Paraguay, Uruguay, Venezuela
- Celtis strychnoides Planch. – northern Australia
- Celtis tala Gillet ex Planch. – South America
- Celtis tenuifolia Nutt. – North America
- Celtis tessmannii Rendle. – central Africa
- Celtis tetrandra Roxb. – Pakistan to China and Malesia
- Celtis tikalana Lundell – Guatemala
- Celtis timorensis Span. – Indian Subcontinent to Malesia
- Celtis toka (Forssk.) Hepper & J.R.I.Wood – western, north-central, and northeastern Africa
- Celtis tournefortii L. – Balkan Peninsula to Iran
- Celtis trinervia Lam. – southeast Mexico to Columbia
- Celtis vandervoetiana C.K.Schneid. – southern China
- Celtis vitiensis A.C.Sm. – Fiji
- Celtis zenkeri Engl. – western, central, and eastern Africa

==== Removed from genus ====
- Trema cannabina Lour. (as C. amboinensis Willd.)
- Trema lamarckianum (Schult.) Blume (as C. lamarckiana Schult.)
- Trema orientalis (L.) Blume (as C. guineensis Schumach. or C. orientalis L.)
- Trema tomentosa (Roxb.) H.Hara (as C. aspera Brongn. or C. tomentosa Roxb.)

== Distribution and habitat ==
The genus is widespread throughout tropical and temperate parts of the world, occurring on all continents except Antarctica.

== Ecology ==
Some species, including common hackberry (C. occidentalis) and C. brasiliensis, are honey plants and a pollen source for honeybees of lesser importance.

=== Lepidoptera ===
Celtis species are used as food plants by the caterpillars of certain Lepidoptera. These include mainly brush-footed butterflies, most importantly the distinct genus Libythea (beak butterflies) and some Apaturinae (emperor butterflies):

- Acytolepis puspa – common hedge blue, recorded on Chinese hackberry (C. sinensis)
- Automeris io – Io moth, recorded on southern hackberry (C. laevigata)
- Asterocampa celtis – hackberry butterfly or hackberry emperor
- Libythea celtis – European beak
- Libythea labdaca – African beak
- Libythea lepita – common beak
- Libythea myrrha – club beak, recorded on C. tetrandra
- Libytheana carinenta – American snout or common snout butterfly
- Nymphalis xanthomelas – scarce tortoiseshell, recorded on European hackberry (C. australis)
- Sasakia charonda – great purple emperor, recorded on C. jessoensis and C. sinensis
- A putative new taxon of the two-barred flasher (Astraptes fulgerator) cryptic species complex, provisionally called "CELT," has hitherto only been found on C. iguanaea.

=== Pathogens ===
The plant pathogenic basidiomycete fungus Perenniporia celtis was first described from a Celtis host plant.

=== Habitat Loss ===
Some species of Celtis are threatened by habitat destruction.

== Uses ==
Several species are grown as ornamental trees, valued for their drought tolerance. They are a regular feature of arboreta and botanical gardens, particularly in North America. Chinese hackberry (C. sinensis) is suited for bonsai culture; a magnificent specimen in Daegu-myeon is one of the natural monuments of South Korea.

The berries are generally edible when they ripen and fall. C. occidentalis fruit was used by the Omaha, eaten casually, as well as the Dakota people, who pounded them fine, seeds and all. The Pawnee used the pounded fruits in combination with fat and parched corn. The berries of C. douglasii are also edible, and were consumed by the Mescalero Apaches.

Hackberry wood is sometimes used in cabinetry and woodworking.

== Gallery ==
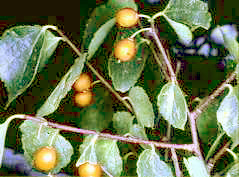
C. aetnensis with mature fruit

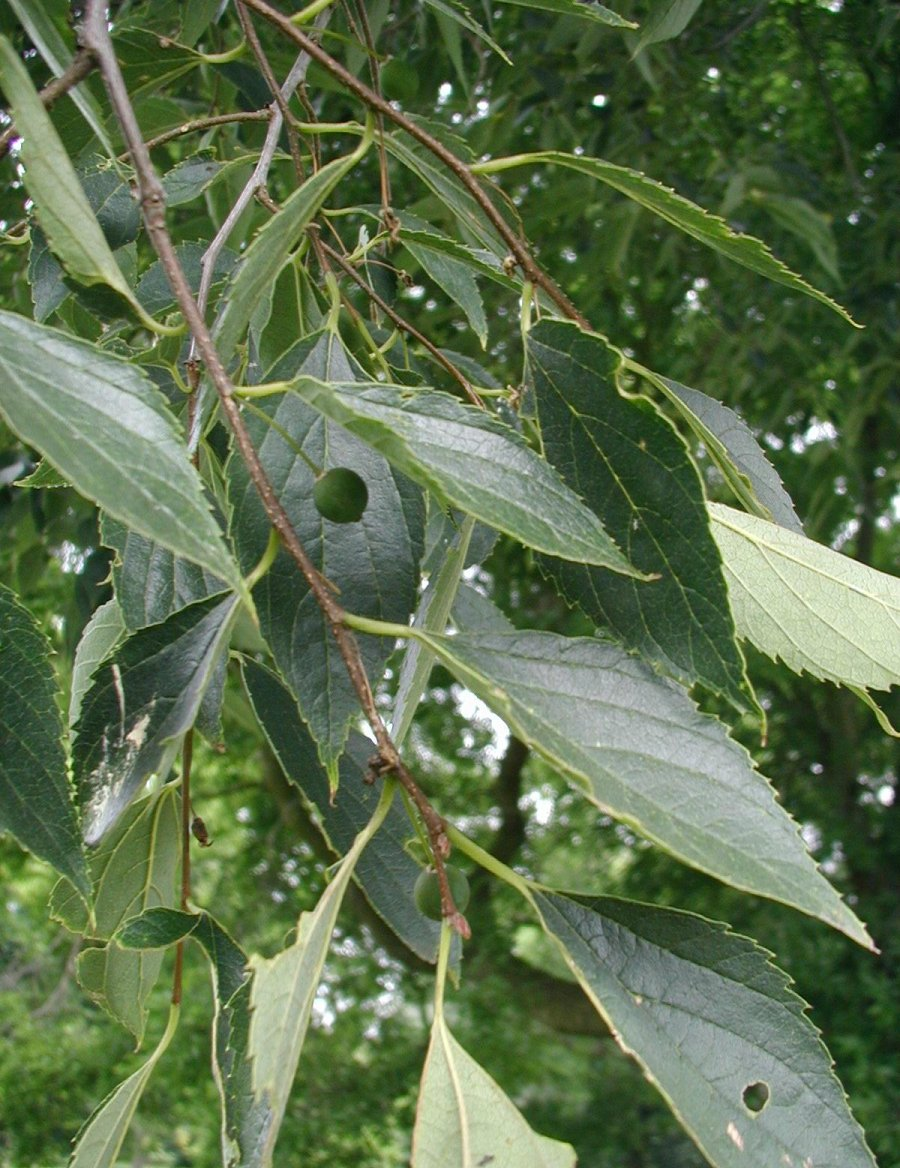
Caucasian hackberry (C. caucasica) with immature fruit

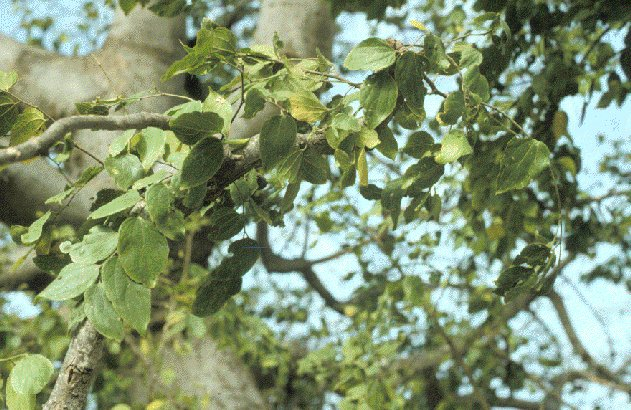
African hackberry (C. integrifolia)

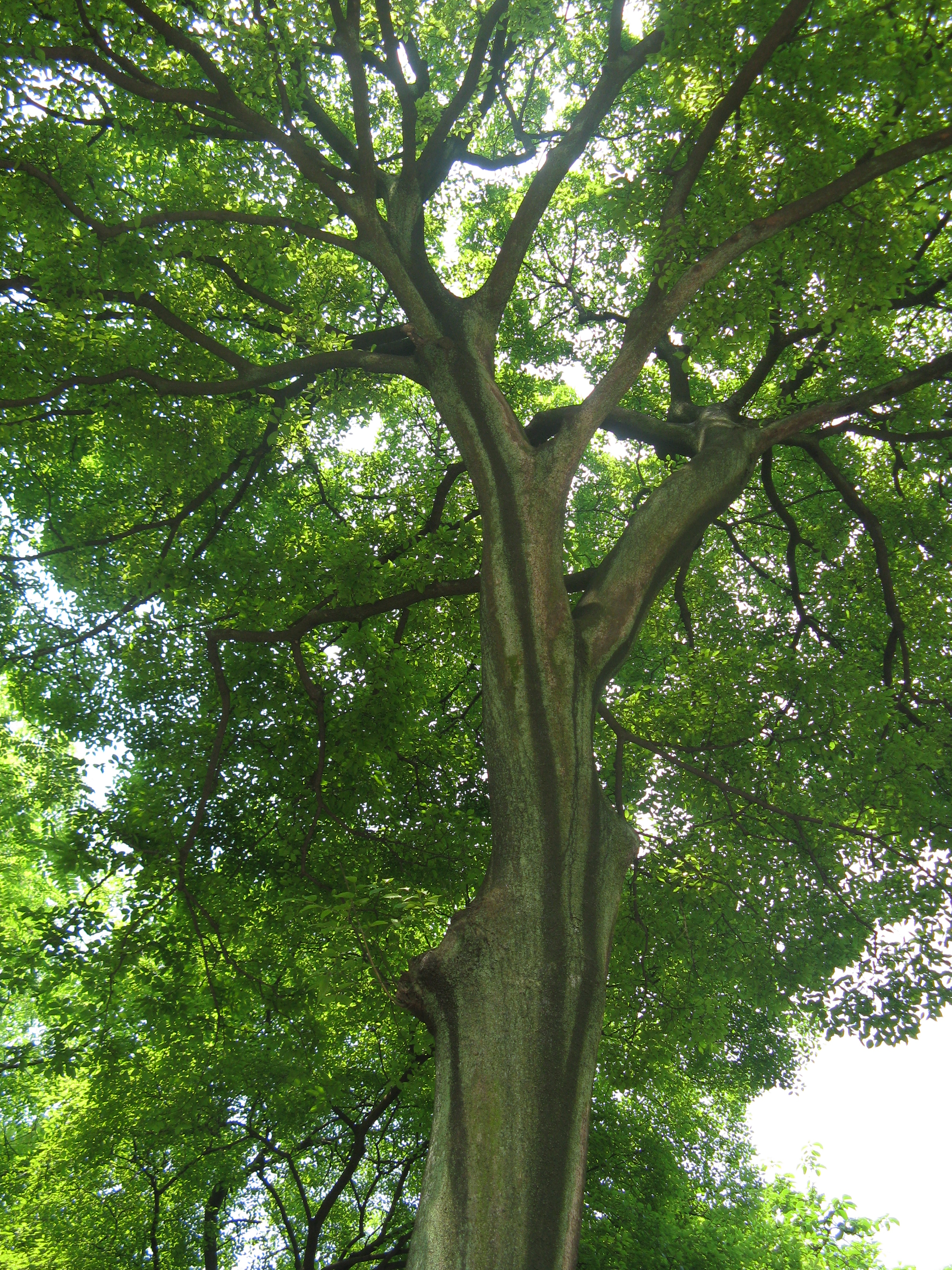
Chinese hackberry (C. sinensis)

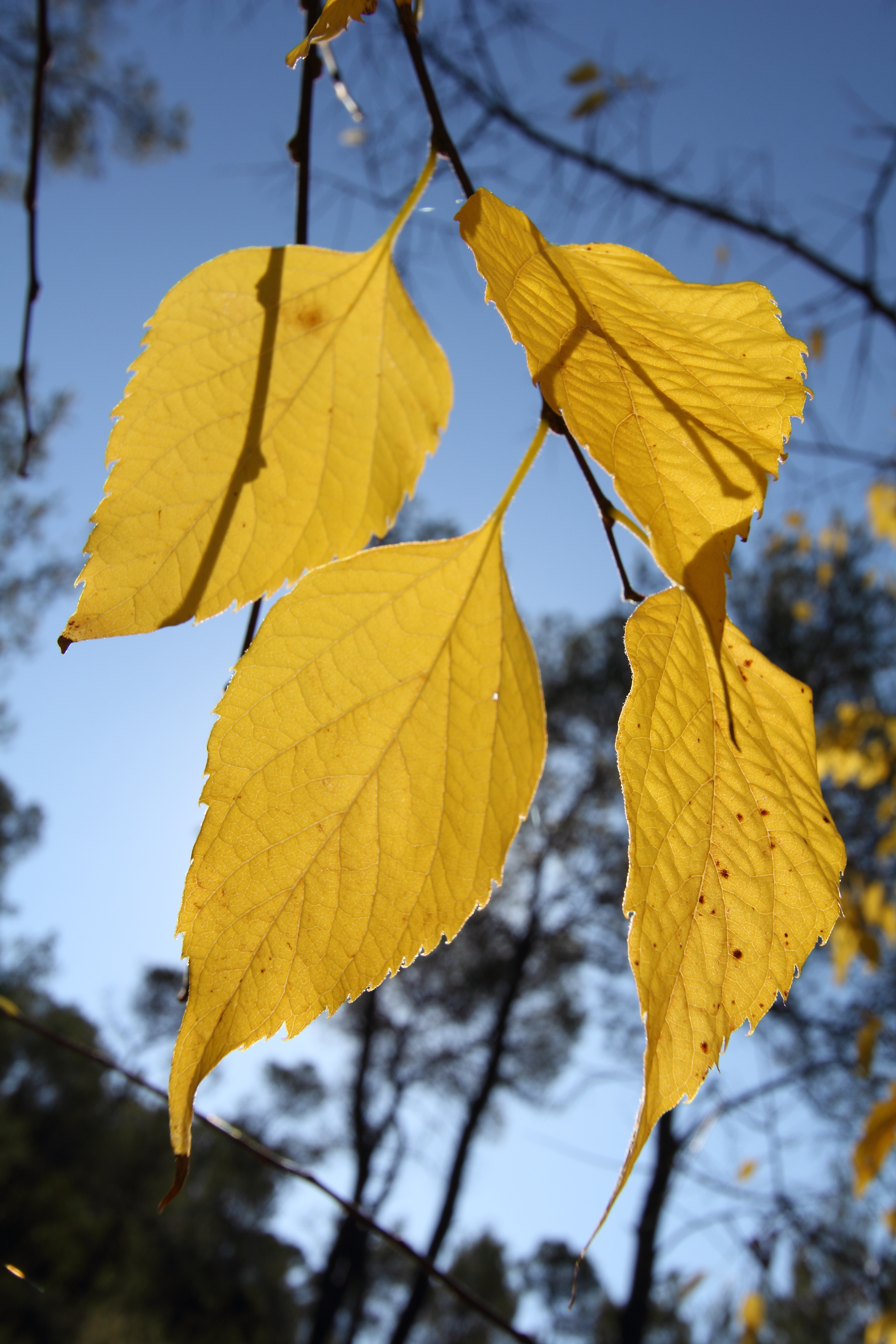
C. australis autumn leaves
