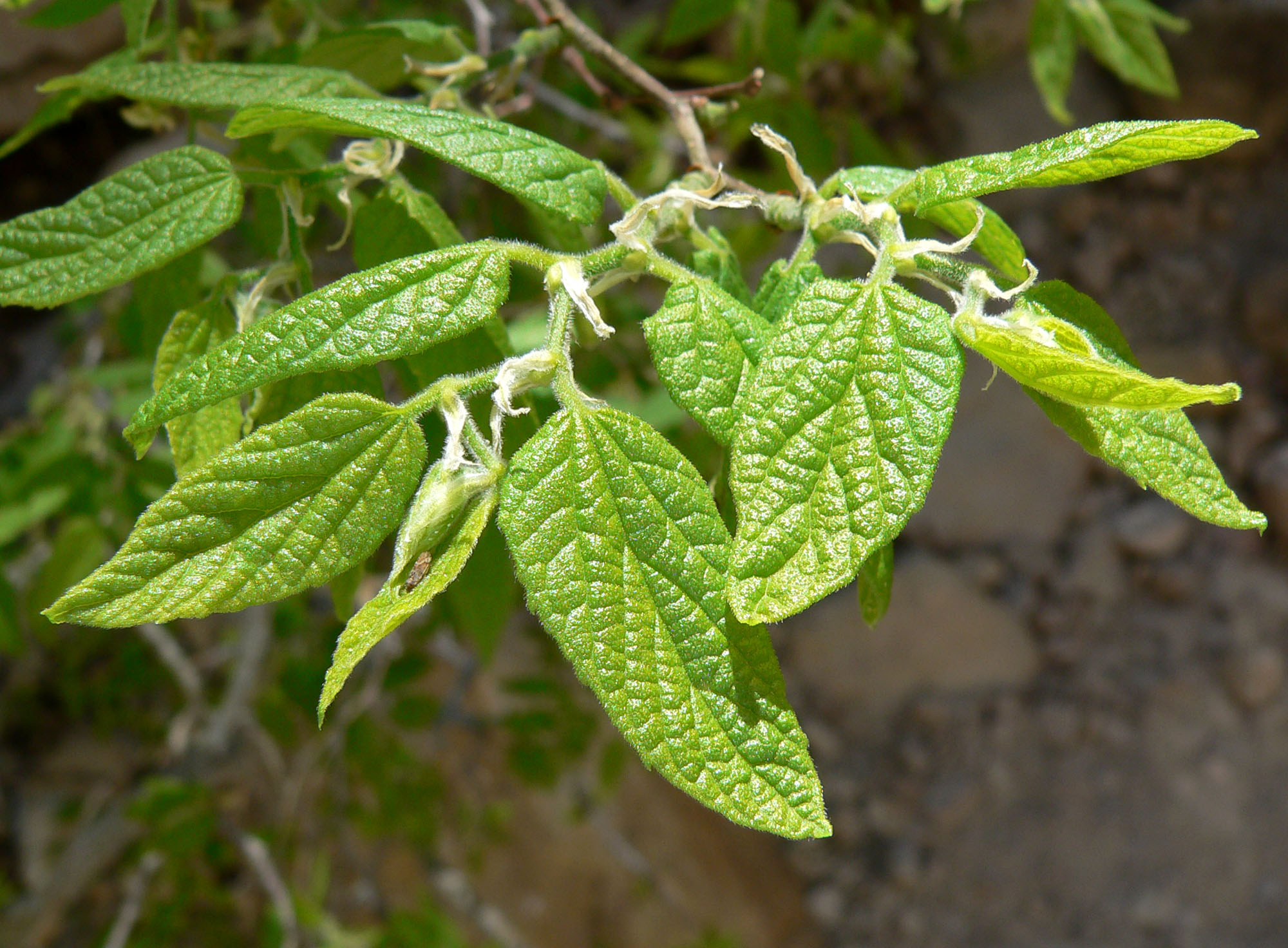

Scientific classification
- Kingdom: Plantae
- Clade: Tracheophytes
- Clade: Angiosperms
- Clade: Eudicots
- Clade: Rosids
- Order: Rosales
- Family: Cannabaceae
- Genus: Celtis
- Species: C. reticulata

Binomial name
- Celtis reticulata Torr.
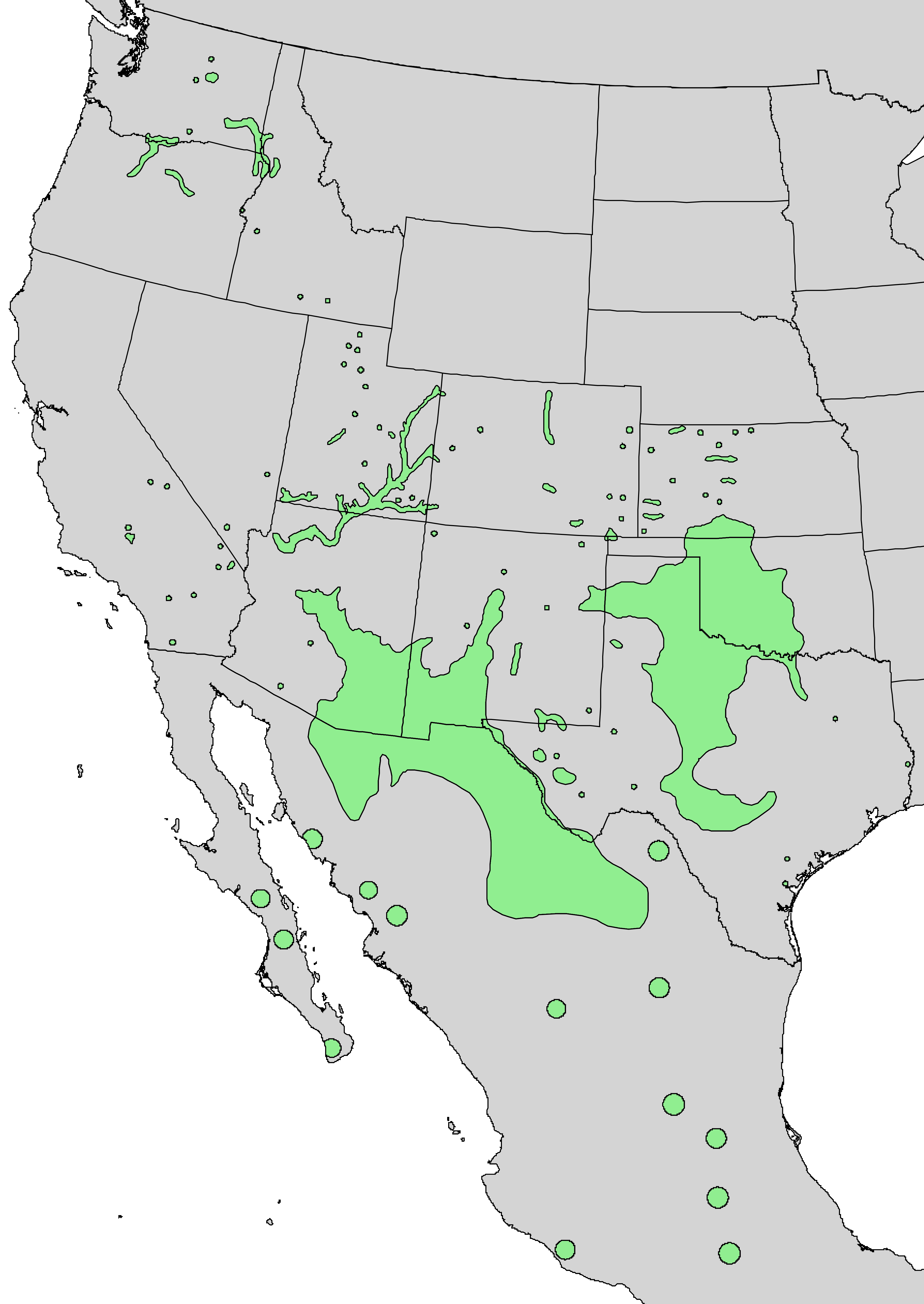
- Natural range of Celtis reticulata

= Celtis reticulata =

Species of tree

Celtis reticulata, with common names including netleaf hackberry, western hackberry, Douglas hackberry, netleaf sugar hackberry, palo blanco, and acibuche, is a small- to medium-sized deciduous tree native to western North America.

== Description ==
Celtis reticulata usually grows to a small-sized tree, 6 to 9 metres (20 to 30 feet) in height and mature at 15 to 35 centimetres (6 to 14 inches) in diameter, although some individuals are known up to 21 m (70 ft) high and 60 cm (24 in) thick. It is often scraggly, stunted or even a large bush. It grows at altitudes of 500–1,700 m (1,600–5,600 ft).

Hackberry bark is gray to brownish gray with the trunk bark forming vertical corky ridges that are checkered between the furrows. The young twigs are puberulent, or covered with very fine hairs. The blade of the leaves can be 2–8 cm (3/4–3 1/4 in) long, usually about 5–6 cm (2–2 1/2 in). They are lanceolate to ovate, disproportionate at the base, leathery, entire to serrate (tending toward serrate), clearly net-veined, base obtuse to more or less cordate, tip obtuse to acuminate, and scabrous, with a dark green upper surface and a yellowish-green lower surface. The small stalks attaching the leaf blade to the stem (the petioles) are generally about 5 to 6 millimetres (3/16 to 1/4 in) long.

The flowers are very small, averaging 2 mm across. They form singly, or in cymose clusters pedicel in fr 4–15 mm. The fruit is a rigid, brownish to purple berry, 5 to 12 mm in diameter, with thin, sweet pulp. If uneaten, they can stay on the plant through early winter.

=== Similar species ===
C. reticulata is often confused with the related species Celtis pallida, the spiny hackberry or desert hackberry, Celtis occidentalis, the common hackberry, and Celtis laevigata, the sugarberry or southern hackberry.

== Distribution and habitat ==
=== Prehistoric ===
Celtis reticulata was one of the species analyzed in a pollen core sampling study in northern Arizona, in which the early to late Holocene flora association was reconstructed; this study in the Waterman Mountains (Pima County, Arizona) demonstrated that C. reticulata was found to be present after the Wisconsinan glaciation, but is not a current taxon of this former Pinyon–juniper woodland area which is now in central and northern Arizona.

=== Current ===
At its western edge, the tree's natural range includes the Columbia River Basin of Oregon, Washington, and western Idaho. It can also be found in Southern California in the southwestern Sierra Nevada foothills, the Peninsular Ranges and eastern Transverse Ranges, and the Mojave Desert sky islands.

Its central range includes the Rio Grande watershed and the Chihuahuan Desert in southern Arizona and New Mexico, western Texas, and northern Sonora-Chihuahua-Coahuila. It is also found in the Madrean Sky Islands of the Sierra Madre Occidental in northern Sonora, and in the White Mountains and along the Mogollon Rim in Arizona. The banks of the Colorado River also provide suitable habitat, from the Grand Canyon northeast through Utah to western Colorado.

Its easternmost natural range is in the hills of Texas, Oklahoma, Kansas, and Louisiana.

The species grows in alluvial soils and rocky sites far above the water line. It is very drought tolerant, accepting sites with only 18 cm (7 in) in annual precipitation.

== Ecology ==
The leaves are eaten by a number of insects, particularly certain moth caterpillars. The berries are eaten by wildlife, including birds. Mule deer and bighorn sheep eat the fresh twigs. Beavers feed on the plant as well.

== Cultivation ==
Celtis reticulata is cultivated by plant nurseries and available as an ornamental plant for native plant, drought-tolerant, natural landscape, and habitat gardens, and for ecological restoration projects.

== Uses ==
The berries and seeds have long been used as a food source by Native Americans of the Southwestern United States, including the Apache (Chiricahua and Mescalero), both fresh and preserved, and the Navajo, who eat them both fresh and ground.
