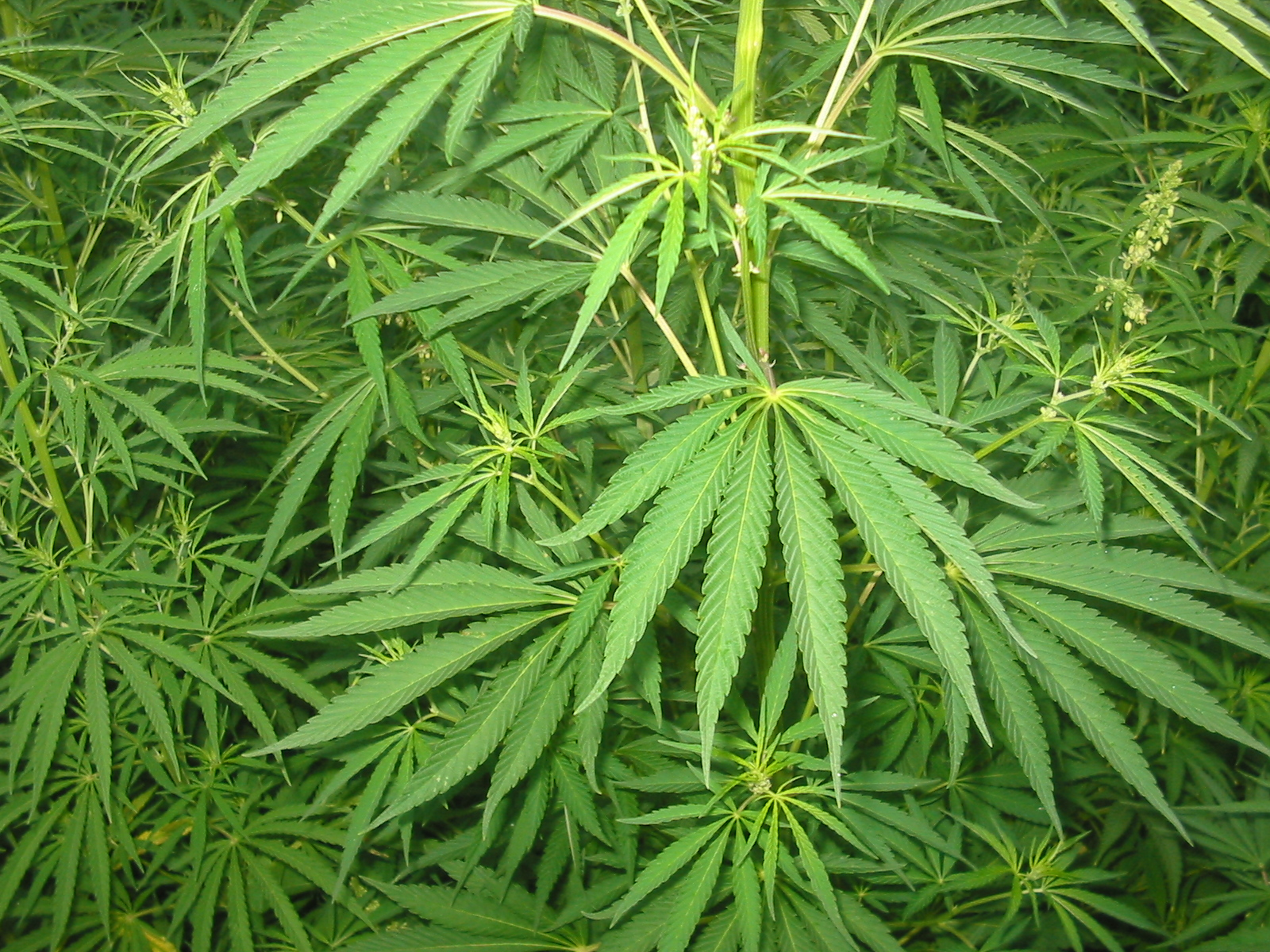
- Cannabis sativa
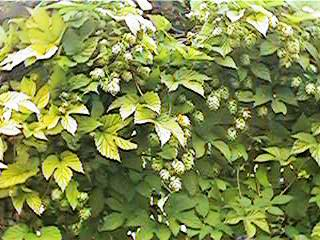
- Humulus lupulus 'Aurea' (hops)

Scientific classification
- Kingdom: Plantae
- Clade: Embryophytes
- Clade: Tracheophytes
- Clade: Spermatophytes
- Clade: Angiosperms
- Clade: Eudicots
- Clade: Rosids
- Order: Rosales
- Family: Cannabaceae; Martinov

Genera
- See text

Synonyms
- Celtidaceae Endl.

= Cannabaceae =

Cannabaceae Temporal range: Turonian - recent

Family of flowering plants known as the hemp family

Cannabaceae is a small family of flowering plants, known as the hemp family. As now circumscribed, the family includes about 170 species grouped in about 11 genera, including Cannabis (hemp), Humulus (hops) and Celtis (hackberries). Celtis is by far the largest genus, containing about 100 species.

Cannabaceae is a member of the Rosales. Members of the family are erect or climbing plants with petalless flowers and dry, one-seeded fruits. Hemp (Cannabis) and hop (Humulus) are the most economically important species.

Other than a shared evolutionary origin, members of the family have few common characteristics; some are trees (e.g. Celtis), others are herbaceous plants (e.g. Cannabis).

== Description ==
Members of this family can be trees (e.g. Celtis), erect herbs (e.g. Cannabis), or twining herbs (e.g. Humulus).

Leaves are often more or less palmately lobed or palmately compound and always bear stipules. Cystoliths are always present and some members of this family possess laticifers.

Cannabaceae are often dioecious (distinct male and female plants). The flowers are actinomorphic (radially symmetrical) and not ornate, as these plants are pollinated by the wind. As an adaptation to this kind of pollination, the calyx and corolla are radically reduced to only vestigial remnants found as an adherent perianth coating the seed. A reduced and monophyllous cuplike perigonal bract, properly known as the bracteole, immediately surrounds and protects the seed and is often misnamed as a "calyx". Flowers are grouped to form cymes. In the dioecious plants the male inflorescences are long and look like panicles, while the female ones are shorter and bear fewer flowers. The pistil is made of two connate carpels, the usually superior ovary is unilocular; there is no fixed number of stamens.

The fruit can be an achene or a drupe.

== Taxonomy ==
=== Classification ===
Classification systems developed prior to the 1990s, such as those of Cronquist (1981) and Dahlgren (1989), typically recognized the order Urticales, which included the families Cannabaceae, Cecropiaceae, Celtidaceae, Moraceae, Ulmaceae and Urticaceae, as then circumscribed. Molecular data from 1990s onwards showed that these families were actually embedded within the order Rosales, so that from the first classification by the Angiosperm Phylogeny Group in 1998, they were placed in an expanded Rosales, forming a group which has been called 'urticalean rosids'.

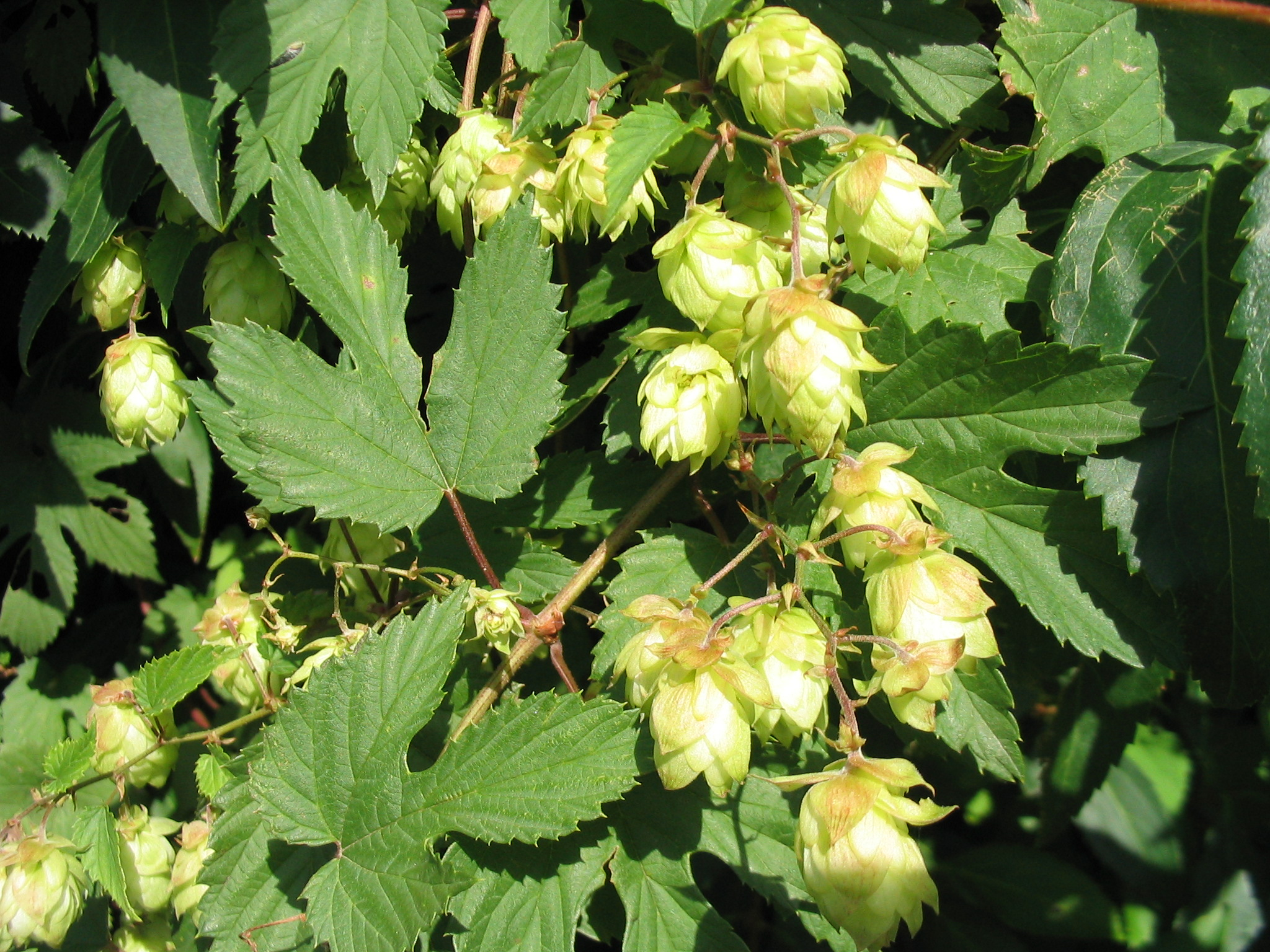
Humulus lupulus with nearly mature flowers (hops)

Cannabaceae comprises the following genera:

- Aphananthe Planch. (5 spp.)
- Cannabis —Hemp (3 spp.)
- Celtis L. (73–109 spp.)
- Chaetachme Planch. (1 sp.)
- Gironniera Gaudich. (6 spp.)
- Humulus L.—Hop (3 spp.)
- Lozanella Greenm. (2 spp.)
- Parasponia Miq. (5–10 spp.)
- Pteroceltis Maxim. (1 sp.)
- Sparrea Hunz. & Dottori 1978
- Trema Lour. (12–42 spp.)

=== Phylogeny ===
Cannabaceae likely originated in East Asia during the Late Cretaceous. The oldest known pollen typical of members of Cannabaceae is from the Late Cretaceous (Turonian ~94–90 million years ago) of Sarawak, Borneo. Fossils show Cannabaceae were widely distributed in the Northern Hemisphere during the early Cenozoic, though their distribution shifted towards tropical regions in the later Cenozoic due to changing climates.

Modern molecular phylogenetics suggest the following relationships:

Cladogram of Cannabaceae genera

- - Moraceae (outgroup)
  - Cannabaceae
    - Aphananthe
    - - Gironniera
      - - Lozanella
        - - - Cannabis
            - Humulus
          - - Celtis
            - - - Pteroceltis
                - Chaetachme
              - Trema (including Parasponia)

== Uses ==
Carbon dating has revealed that these plants may have been used for ritual/medicinal purposes in Xinjiang, China, as early as 494 BC.

Humulus lupulus, the common hop, has been the predominant bittering agent of beer for hundreds of years. The flowers' resins are responsible for beer's bitterness and their ability to extend shelf life due to some antimicrobial qualities. The young shoots can be used as a vegetable.

Some plants in the genus Cannabis are cultivated as hemp for the production of fiber, as a source of cheap oil, for their nutritious seeds, or their edible leaves. Others are cultivated for medical or recreational use as dried flowers, extracts, or infused food products. Induced parthenocarpy in pistilate flowers, and selective breeding are used to produce either higher or lower yields of tetrahydrocannabinol (THC), other cannabinoids, as well as terpenes with desired flavors or aromas, such as blueberry, strawberry, or even citrus.

Many trees in the genus Celtis are grown for landscaping and ornamental purposes, and the bark of Pteroceltis is used to produce high-end Chinese paper.
