= Arti =

Arti may refer to:

== Places ==
- Arti, Russia, an urban locality in Sverdlovsk Oblast
- Arți, a village in Șugag Commune, Alba County, Romania
- Arti, a village in Aurangabad district, Bihar, India

== Other uses ==
- Arti (Hinduism), a Hindu ritual of worship
- Arti (given name), a feminine given name
- Arti, an alternative name for the Guilds of Florence
- ARTİ (Azərbaycan Respublikasının Təhsil İnstitutu), the Institute of Education of the Republic of Azerbaijan
- Aarti (film), a 1962 Indian Bollywood film
- Arti et Amicitiae, a Dutch artist's society in Amsterdam
- Acute respiratory tract infection
- Arti, an implementation of the Tor (network) protocol in Rust

== See also ==
- Aarthi (disambiguation)
- Arathi
- Artis (disambiguation)
