= Darwinism and Design =

1873 book by George St. Clair

Darwinism and Design; Or, Creation by Evolution
- Author: George St. Clair
- Subject: Evolution
- Publication date: 1873

Darwinism and Design; Or, Creation by Evolution is an 1873 book by George St. Clair that advocates theistic evolution. The author argues that the argument from design is compatible with Darwin's theory of evolution.

The books maintains that evolution is the method of creation. The book was reviewed in the British Quarterly Review, Journal of Mental Science and the Quarterly Journal of Science.

The British Quarterly Review commented that:

We congratulate the author on the ground of his conscientious and the scientific treatment of a profound and intricate problem. He suggests from the correlation of the physical and vital forces that, if the final evolution of energy is consciousness, and will, it is reasonable to suppose that the starting-place, the origin of all force, is infinite mind and will. This is an ingenious argumentum ad hominem, but we are far from accepting any such transmutation of force as is implied.

The Journal of Mental Science found his mixture of science and theology untenable but praised Clair for his sincerity in accepting the evidence for evolution.

The book received anonymous reviews by biologist Alfred Russel Wallace that were generally supportive.

Botanist Asa Gray described Clair as a "theistic Darwinian" and suggested he had handled the subject from a "mainly sensible" basis.

In 2003, the book and reviews were republished in Richard England's Design After Darwin, 1860-1900.

== See also ==
- Darwiniana
