= Artis Library =

19th-century library in Amsterdam

Coordinates: 52.3655°N 4.9149°E

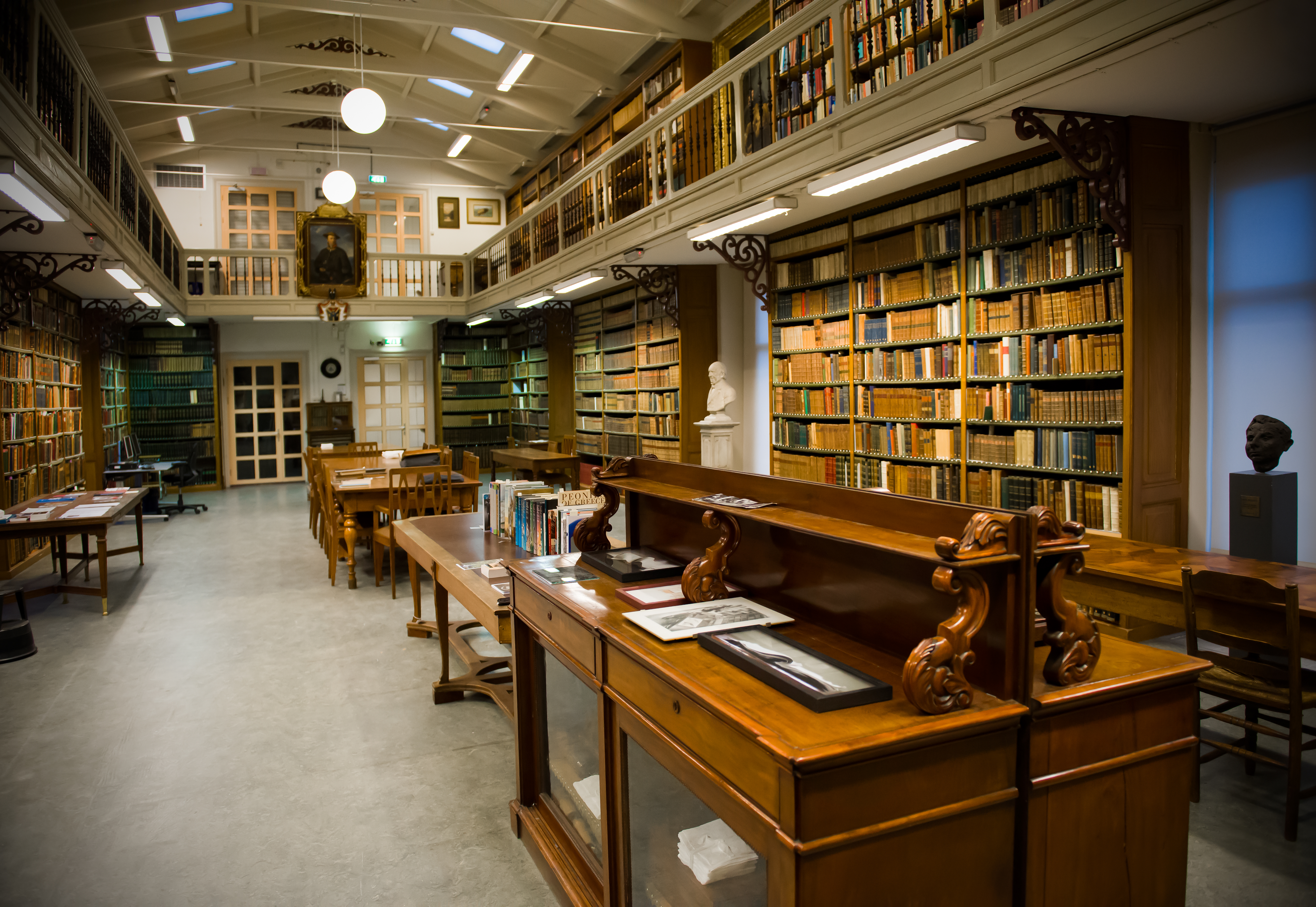
Artis Bibliotheek

The Artis Library (Dutch: Artis Bibliotheek) is a nineteenth-century library located at Plantage Middenlaan 45 in Amsterdam. Since 2005, the Artis Bibliotheek has been part of the Special Collections at the University of Amsterdam, which in turn has been part of the Allard Pierson Museum since 2019.

== History ==
The Zoological Society Natura Artis Magistra was founded by a number of Amsterdam notables, including bookseller and bird lover Gerardus Frederik Westerman (1807-1890), on 1 May 1838. The aim was "to promote the knowledge of natural history." This was done by founding not just the Artis Zoo, but also a zoological museum and a library. The society immediately received donations (including one from Westerman) for the library, allowing the library to stock its shelves. The society also immediately started buying large quantities of books and journals.

In 1881, librarian Gilles Janse compiled a catalogue of the Artis Library's collection, which held 4381 items at the time. The Artis Library grew to include more than 16,000 titles. From 1848 to 1995, the Zoological Society Natura Artis Magistra published the journal Contributions to Zoology. All issues of this journal are now in the collection of the Artis Bibliotheek.

When the Athenaeum Illustre of Amsterdam became a university in 1877, there was a demand for space to teach the zoology course. In response to this demand, the municipality made a deal with Natura Artis Magistra to build a new aquarium to give the university the space they needed and gain access to the society's collections. This building was completed in 1882. Zoology professor Max Weber (1852-1937) became the director of this "Zootomic and Zoological Laboratory." Weber's responsiblities gradually decreased until, in 1898, he only supervised the zoological collections. This led to the creation of the Zoological Museum. Director Henk Engel combined the Artis Library with the Zoological Museum in 1961. The collections of the Zoological Museum moved to the Naturalis Biodiversity Center in Leiden. This included the museum's library. The Artis Library was not included in this move, however, and has remained at Plantage Middenlaan.

== Building ==
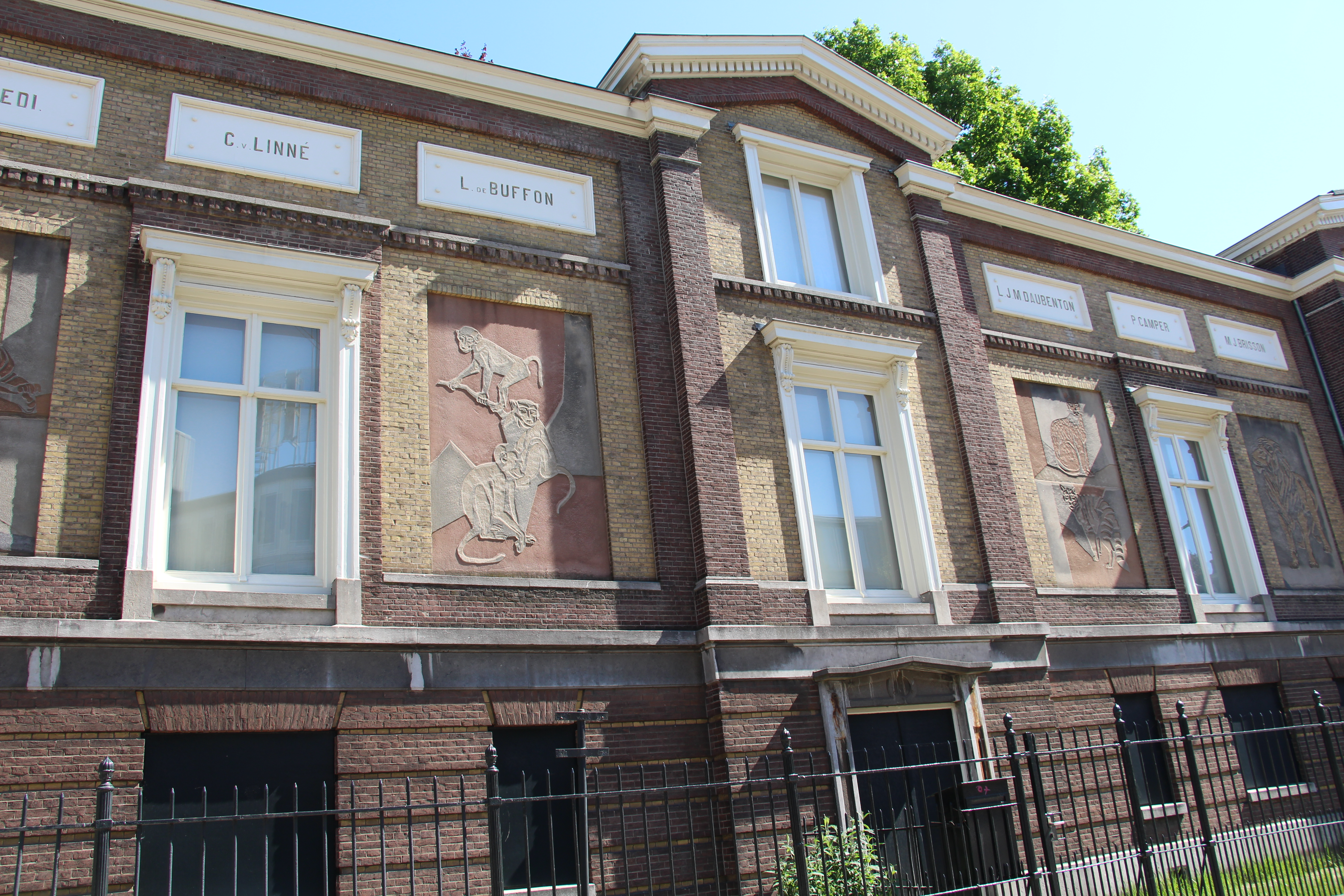
Library building exterior in 2016

Westerman initially kept many of the library’s items in his home. It was not until 1854 that the collection was housed in its own building at the zoo. The library officially opened to members starting from 1 January 1858, opening only on Tuesdays and Thursdays. Westerman had bought a significant portion of the books with his own money, as Artis did not have any funds for it. With the opening of the library, Artis officially bought the collection from him for a yearly sum of ƒ 600,-.

The collection was moved to its current location on the Plantage Middenlaan in 1868. The building was designed by the Amsterdam architect GB Salm (1831-1897). Between 1868 and 1872, the building was expanded to accommodate the society's zoological collections. In 1885, two galleries of the museum were used to house the Museum voor de Nederlandsche Fauna (English: Museum of Dutch Fauna). Stables were constructed on the ground floor to house the living animals. This is where, in 1883, the last quagga died. The zebras were housed in the stables underneath the library until 1920.

The building, including the nineteenth-century interior, officially became a rijksmonument in 1972.

== Research ==
The Artis Bibliotheek has been used for education and research since the inception of the University in 1877. Many well-known biologists came to consult the collection with their students, including Max Weber, Dick Hillenius and Tijs Goldschmidt.

After the Artis Bibliotheek became part of the University of Amsterdam's Special Collections in 2005, the target audience moved from biologists to historians of art, science, and the book.

The library has also been used bij writers such as Boudewijn Büch, Redmond O'Hanlon, Kester Freriks, and Midas Dekkers.

== Collections ==
The Artis Bibliotheek collection covers the following subjects: natural history, the Artis Zoo, nature, agriculture, evolutionary theory (Darwiniana), and Carl Linnaeus (Linnaeana).

== Conservators/Librarians ==
- Gerardus Frederik Westerman (1843–1890)
- Pieter H. Witkamp
- Robert T. Maitland
- Gilles Janse (1876–1912)
- Johanna Scholten (1912–1920)
- G.A. Jonges-van de Heyde (1920–1926)
- Johanna Scheffer (1926–1954)
- Johan J. Frieswijk (1961–1964)
- Piet Tuijn (1964–1969)
- Peter van Bree
- Florence F.J.M. Pieters (1969–2000)
- Jaap de Visser (2000–2006)
- Piet Verkruijsse (2006–2011)
- Hans Mulder (2011–2024)
- Myriam van der Hoek (2024–present)
