= Aarti Gupta =

Aarti Gupta may refer to:

- Aarti Gupta (computer scientist), Indian computer scientist
- Aarti Gupta (model), Miss Teen India International 2014
- Aarti Gupta Surendranath, née Gupta, Indian model, actress and producer
