= Arti (given name) =

- Gender: Feminine

Origin
- Meaning: Arti ritual
- Region of origin: India

Other names
- Alternative spelling: Aarti, Arati, Aarthi, Aarathi, Arthie, Artee

Arti (also spelled Aarti, Aarthi or Arati) (Hindi: आरती ārtī) is a Hindu feminine given name, derived from the ritual of the same name. Notable people with the name include:

- Aarathi (born 1954), Indian Kannada-language actress and director
- Aarthi Agarwal (1984–2015), Indian-American actress
- Aarti Bajaj, Indian film editor
- Arti Cameron (born 1988), Guyanese model
- Aarti Chabria (born 1982), Indian actress and model
- Arti Dhand, 21st century Canadian novelist
- Aarthi Ganeshkar (fl. 1987–present), Indian actress, comedian and television host
- Aarti Gupta (computer scientist), Indian computer scientist
- Aarti Gupta (model), Indian model and Miss Teen India International 2014
- Aarti Mann (born 1978), Indian-American actress
- Aarti Mukherjee (born 1943), Indian Bengali-language playback singer
- Aarti Nayak (born 1983), Indian classical vocalist
- Arati Prabhakar (born 1959), American engineer and head of DARPA
- Aarti Puri, Indian actress and model
- Arti K. Rai, American lawyer, law professor and former public official
- Aarthie Ramaswamy (born 1981), Indian chess-player
- Arati Saha (1940–1994), Indian swimmer
- Aarti Sequeira (born 1978), Indian chef and television personality
- Aarti Shrivastava (born 1983), Indian documentary film-maker
- Arti Singh, Indian television actress
- Aarti Gupta Surendranath, Indian model, actress and producer
- Arati Ankalikar Tikekar (born 1963), Indian classical and playback singer
- Arati Vaidya (born 1970), Indian cricketer
