= Aarthi =

Aarthi or Aarathi may refer to:

== Entertainment ==
- Aarathi (born 1954), Indian Kannada-language actress
- Aarthi (actress) (born 1987), Indian Tamil-language actress
- Aarthi Agarwal (1984–2015), Indian-American actress who primarily worked in Telugu cinema
- Aarthi Parthasarathy (born 1984), Indian filmmaker and webcomic creator
- Arthi Venkatesh, Indian model and actress who has appeared in Tamil and Malayalam films
- Aarathi (film), a 1981 Malayalam-language film
- Aarthi (TV series), a Tamil-language TV series

== Other ==
- Arti (given name) or Aarthi, a female given name (including a list of persons with the name)
- Aarti or aarthi, a ritual in Hinduism

== See also ==
- Arti (disambiguation)
- Arathi
