= Copyright Act 2022, Nigeria =

Act of Parliament in Nigeria

Copyright Act 2022

National Assembly
- Long title: An Act to consolidate and amend the law relating to copyright
- Commenced: 17 March 2023
- Administered by: President Muhammadu Buhari

Repeals
- Copyright Act CAP C28, Laws of the Federation of Nigeria, 2004.
- Status: Current legislation

The Copyright Act 2022 is an Act of Parliament passed in Nigeria as enacted by the National Assembly that, along with its various amendments, governs copyright in Nigeria.

It was signed on March 17, 2023, by President Muhammadu Buhari. It is administered by the Nigerian Copyright Commission (NCC), and the law repealed the Nigerian Copyright Act of 2004.

== Scope ==
The Copyright Act established the Nigerian Copyright Commission, which governs all copyright matters in Nigeria, ranging from the regulations, protection, enforcement, and prosecution of copyright-related matters in Nigeria.

The act is divided into twelve parts. This includes;

Part I: Objectives, Scope, and Subsistence of Copyright

Part II: Exceptions to Copyright

Part III: Ownerships, Transfers & Licenses

Part IV: Copyright Infringements

Part V: Copyright Offences

Part VI: Anti-Piracy and Other Measures

Part VII: Provisions relating to Online Contents

Part VIII: Performers' Rights

Part VIV: Expressions of Folklore

Part X: Establishment of the Nigerian Copyright Commission and Copyright Administration

Part XI: Financial Provisions

Part XII: Miscellaneous Provisions

== Significant portions of the Act ==
Section 1 clarifies which works qualify for protection under the Copyright Act.

=== Subject matter of copyright ===
The Act defines "works of authorship" as any of the following:

1. literary works,
2. musical works, including any accompanying words,
3. artistic works, including any accompanying art,
4. Broadcast works,
5. pictorial, graphic, and sculptural works,
6. sound recordings.
