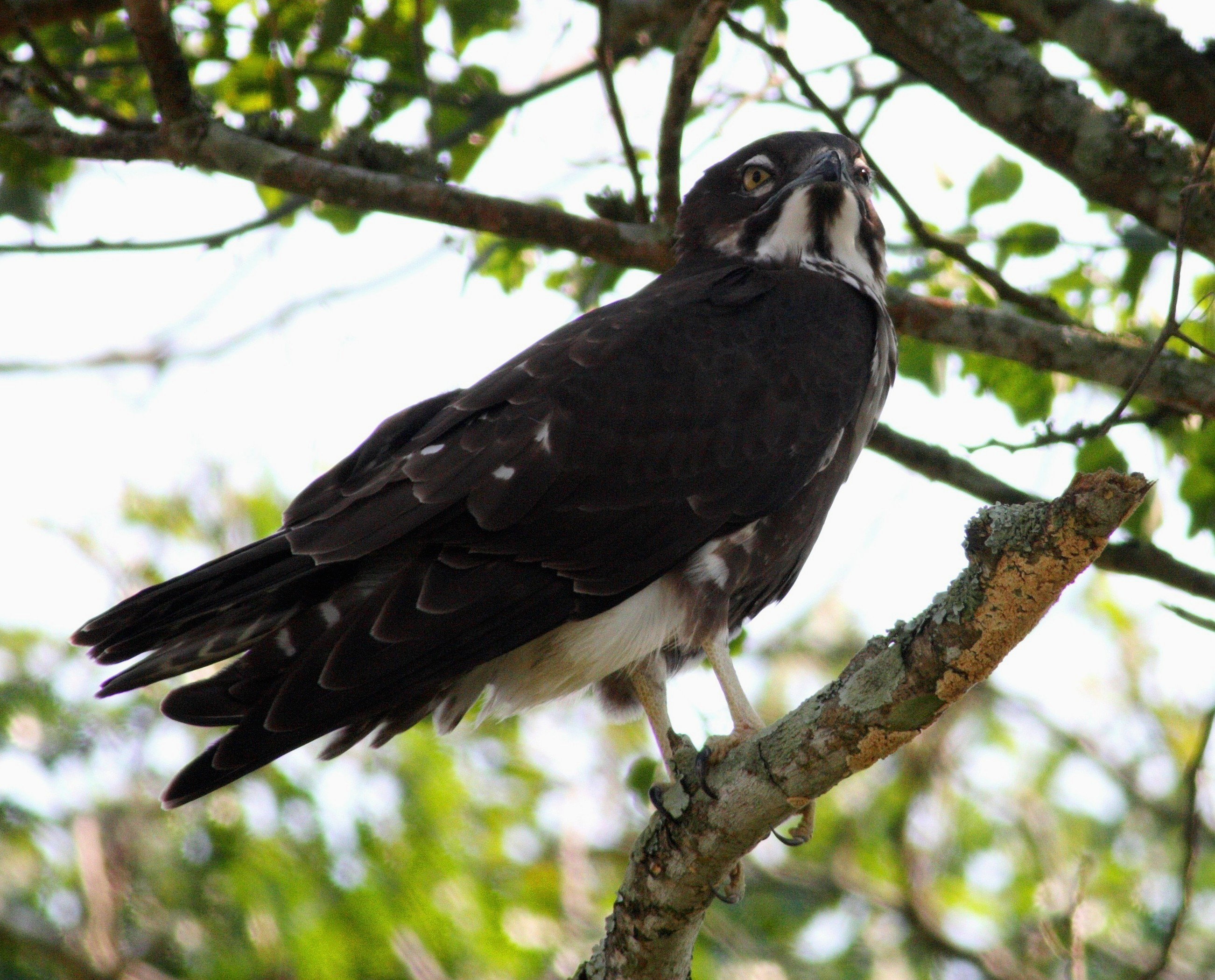
- Bat hawk at Cape Vidal, northern Natal, South Africa

Conservation status
- Least Concern (IUCN 3.1)

Scientific classification
- Kingdom: Animalia
- Phylum: Chordata
- Class: Aves
- Order: Accipitriformes
- Family: Accipitridae
- Genus: Macheiramphus; Bonaparte, 1850
- Species: M. alcinus

Binomial name
- Macheiramphus alcinus Bonaparte, 1850

Subspecies
- M. a. anderssoni M. a. alcinus M. a. papuanus
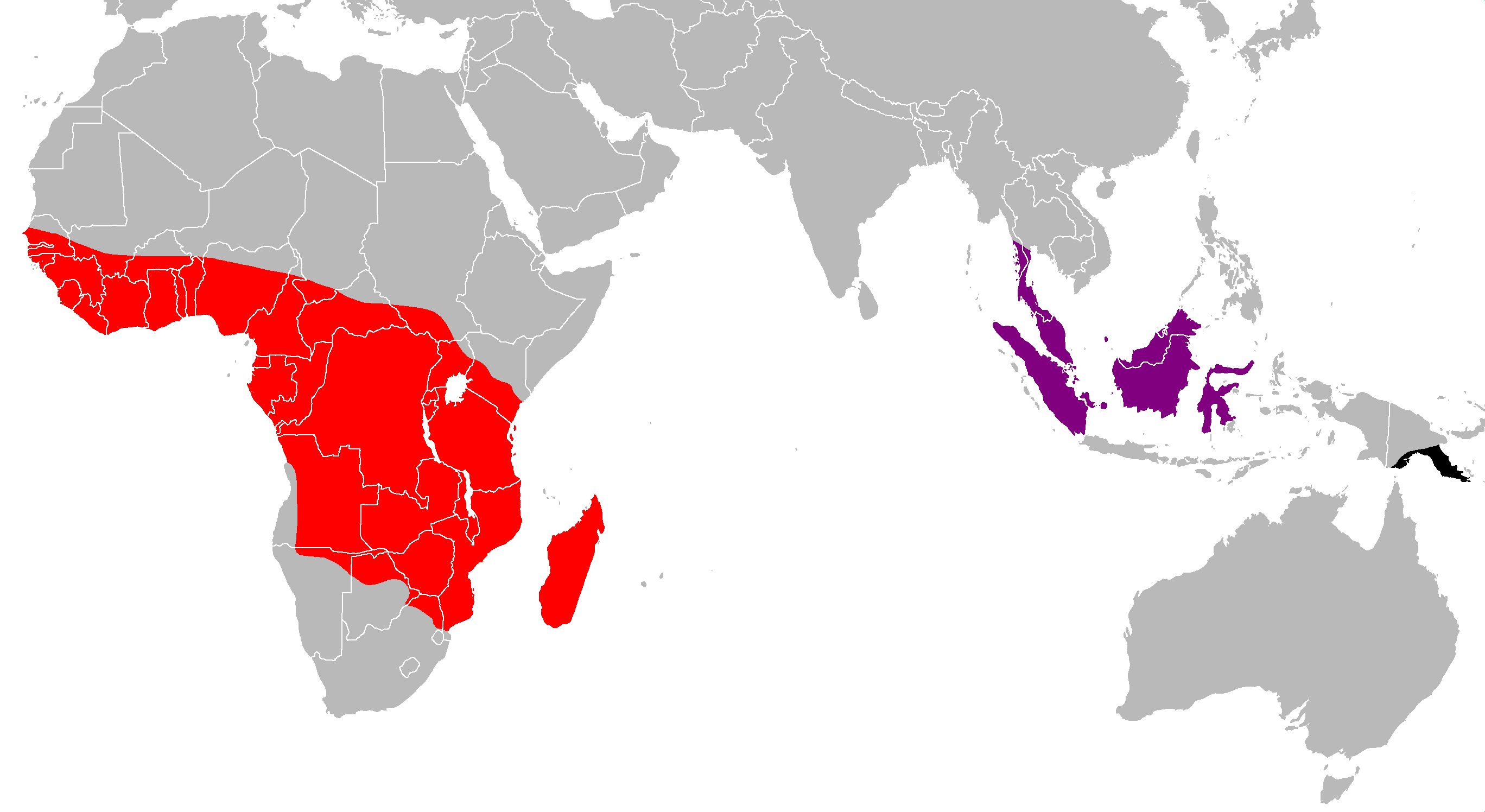

Synonyms
- Machaerhamphus alcinus Westerman, 1851

= Bat hawk =

Species of bird

The bat hawk (Macheiramphus alcinus) is a raptor found in sub-Saharan Africa and south Asia to New Guinea. It is named for its diet, which consists mainly of bats. It requires open space in which to hunt, but will live anywhere from dense rainforest to semi-arid veld.

== Description ==
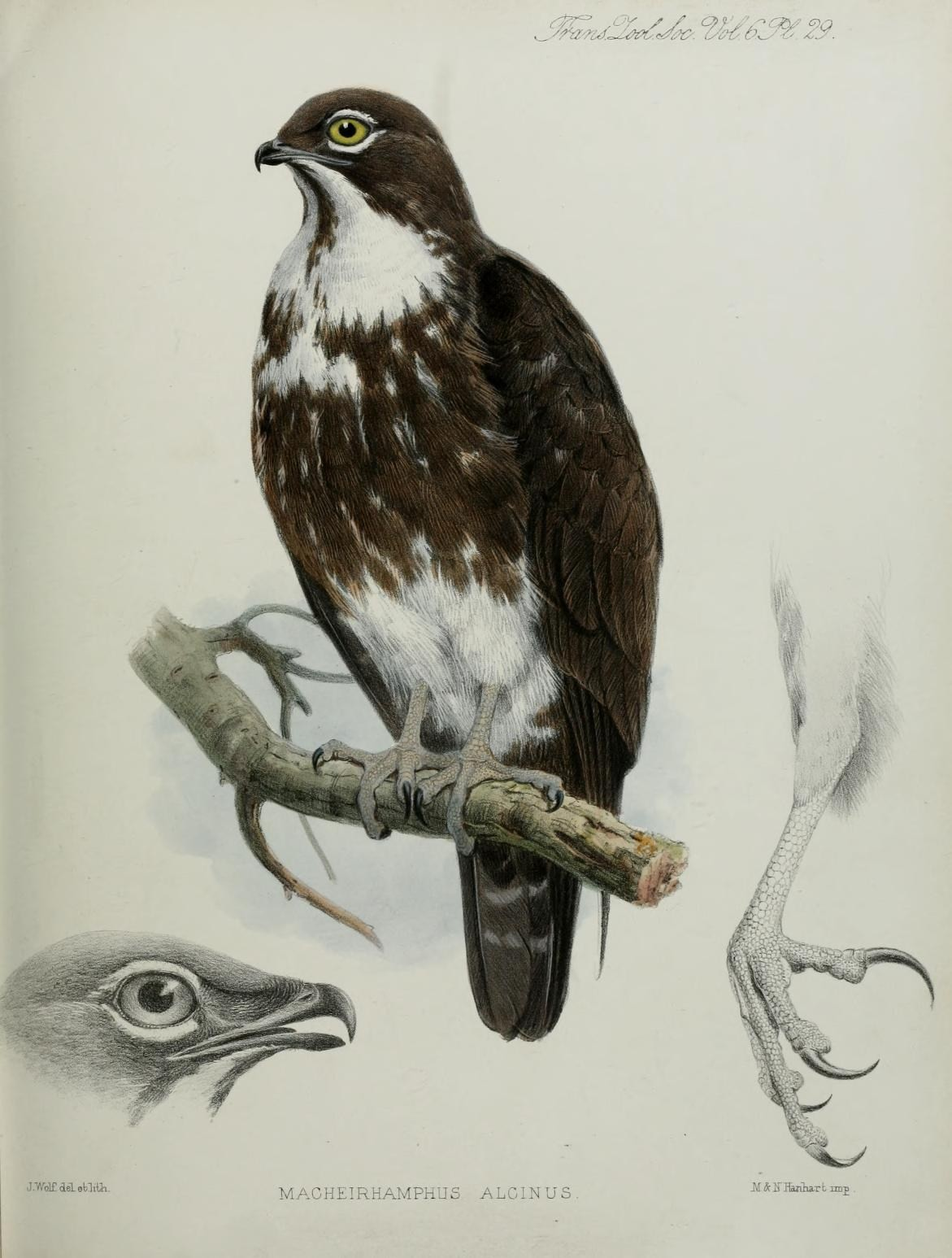
Illustration of M. alcinus

The bat hawk is a slender, medium-sized bird of prey, 45 cm long and weighing 600–650 grams.

It has long wings and a falcon-like silhouette while in flight. Adults are dark brown or black, with a white patch on the throat and chest, and have a white streak above and below each eye. Juveniles are mottled brown and have more white plumage than adults.

== Behaviour ==
=== Hunting ===
Bats are the usual prey of the bat hawk, although they may eat small birds, such as swallows, swifts, and nightjars, or even insects. They hunt by chasing their prey at high speeds in flight. 49.3% of their hunts are successful. Bats are captured by the use of small talons, and swallowed whole immediately in flight. Hunting methods may be similar to that of Swainson's Hawk, which makes use of different approach types (Up-stream, Down-stream and cross-stream) and grab directions/body positions (pitch down, pitch up and roll manoeuvres) to capture prey in a swarm. Bat hawks also show very rapid ingestion rates, taking on average 6 seconds for the prey to reach the stomach after capture.

The bat hawk is crepuscular and hunts at dusk. They can be observed perching near a cave/bat dwelling prior to dusk emergence. They feed on the wing and swallow their prey whole. This feeding habit has resulted in the evolution of an unusually large gape, the largest of any raptor relative to body size, and is more similar to that of insectivorous birds which feed on the wing such as swallows, swifts and nightjars. The evolution of a large gape is likely due to the selective pressure of a limited feeding time. Since bats only emerge at dusk in swarms, a temporal window of ±30 minutes is allotted for bat hawks to hunt. A large gape allows the hawks to feed extremely rapidly, often with multiple captures per hunting bout.

The crepuscular habits, large gape and in-flight manoeuvrability makes the bat hawk well adapted for its choice of prey hunting. This ecological niche is highly exploited by bat hawks, making their competition with other diurnal raptors minimal.

=== Breeding ===
Courtship involves many aerial displays and stunts. The nest is built with sticks gathered in flight, and is about 90 cm across and 30 cm deep. The female is solely responsible for incubating her clutch. The male often shares food with her. About a month after incubation begins, the eggs hatch, and both parents help to feed their young. 30–45 days after hatching, the young fledge. They leave the nest soon after. Bat hawks synchronize their breeding periods with those of bats, capitalizing on slow, expectant females to reach breeding readiness, while young hawks benefit from young bats that have just begun to fly.

Bat hawks typically breed annually.

== Conservation ==
Due to its large range and relatively stable population, the bat hawk is of least concern. However, localized populations are under threat, and it is listed as Endangered in South Africa.

== Etymology ==
The genus name is from Greek: μαχαιρα makhaira meaning knife; and ῥαμφος rhamphos, bill. The specific epithet alcinus means like an auk, from Linnaeus' genus Alca, which is also a reference to the bat hawk's thin bill.

== Taxonomy ==
The spelling of the genus name is problematic. Charles Lucien Bonaparte described the bat hawk in 1850, naming it Macheiramphus alcinus. Westerman described it in 1851 under the name Machaerhamphus alcinus, and this form was used for over a hundred years because it was believed to have been published in 1848. In 1960 Deignan pointed out that Bonaparte has priority, but in 1979 Amadon claimed that Macheiramphus alcinus is an abandoned name. Brooke and Clancey note that the preservation of a junior synonym requires a special ruling from the ICZN that Amadon didn't obtain; whilst Dickinson argues that Deignan's resurrection of the name in 1960 should stand because it predates the first edition of the Code in 1961.
