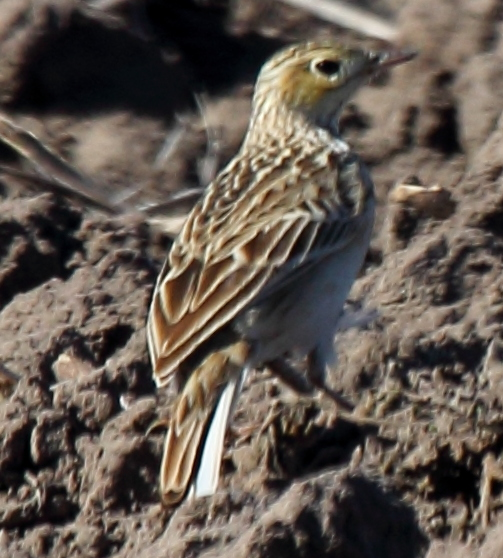

Conservation status
- Vulnerable (IUCN 3.1)

Scientific classification
- Kingdom: Animalia
- Phylum: Chordata
- Class: Aves
- Order: Passeriformes
- Family: Motacillidae
- Genus: Anthus
- Species: A. spragueii

Binomial name
- Anthus spragueii (Audubon, 1844)
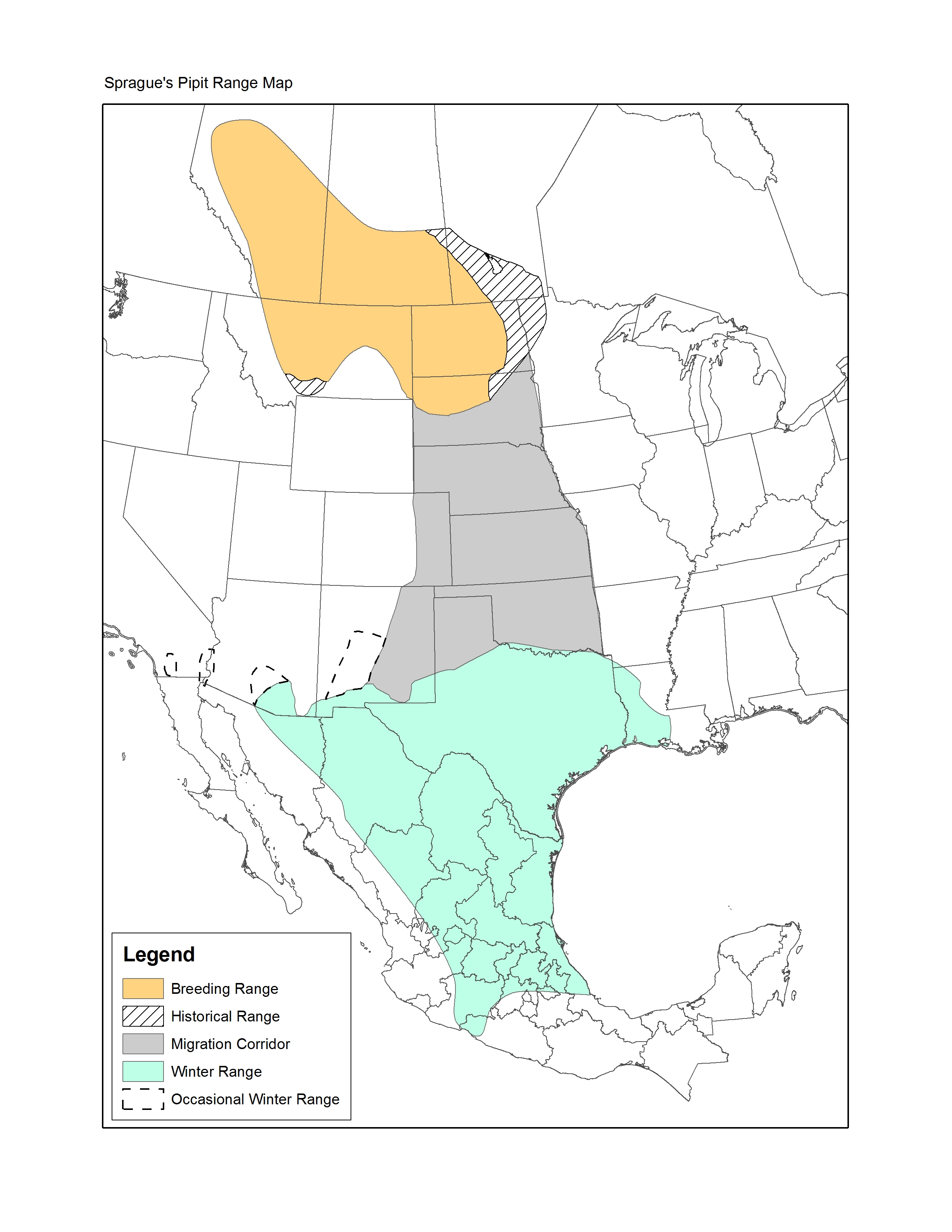
- Range of Sprague's pipit

Synonyms
- Alauda spragueii Audubon, 1844

= Sprague's pipit =

Species of bird

Sprague's pipit (Anthus spragueii) is a small songbird (passerine) in the family Motacillidae that breeds in the short- and mixed-grass prairies of North America. Migratory, it spends the winters in the southwestern United States and northern Mexico. Sprague's pipits are unusual among songbirds in that they sing high in the sky, somewhat like a goldfinch or skylark. It is more often identified by its distinctive descending song heard from above than by being seen on the ground. Males and females are cryptically coloured and similar in appearance; they are a buffy brown with darker streaking, slender bills and pinkish to yellow legs. Sprague's pipit summer habitat is primarily native grasslands in the north central prairies of the United States and Canada (distinguishing them from the American subspecies of the buff-bellied pipit, which breed in the northern Rocky Mountains and the Arctic). The species was named after the botanical illustrator Isaac Sprague.

== Description ==
Measurements:

- Length: 5.9–6.7 in (15–17 cm)
- Weight: 0.6-0.9 oz (18.2-27 g)
- Wingspan: 10 in (25.4 cm)

== Range ==
Found in mixed or short grass prairie throughout the central northern Great Plains of North America. In Canada, Sprague's pipit breed in southern Alberta, southern Saskatchewan, and southwest Manitoba. In the United States, they breed in northeastern and central Montana, western and central North Dakota, northwest South Dakota, and in the Red River Valley of Minnesota.

Sprague's pipits winter in the southwestern United States and northern Mexico. In the United States it occurs from southern California (casually), south-central and southeastern Arizona, southern New Mexico, central and eastern Texas, occasionally found in southern Kansas, southern Oklahoma, very rarely in southern Missouri, Tennessee and northwestern Mississippi south through Arkansas and Louisiana. In October 2016, an individual was found in Connecticut for the first time, suggesting that they could be vagrants to other places as well. In Mexico it is found in the interior from northeastern Sonora and Nuevo Leon south to Zacatecas and San Luis Potosi and along the Atlantic Coast from Tamaulipas to central Veracruz. It is uncommon in the Central Volcanic belt, rare in west Tobasco and a vagrant to s Guerrero (Howell and Webb 1995).

== Ecology and status ==
=== Status ===
Sprague's pipits were listed in 1999 by the Committee on the Status of Endangered Wildlife in Canada (COSEWIC) as "threatened"; the status was re-examined and confirmed in May 2000. Sprague's pipits were officially listed under the Species at Risk Act (SARA) as "threatened" on 5 June 2003 (Jones 2010). In the United States, Sprague's pipits are a candidate for listing as "endangered" or "threatened" under the Endangered Species Act of 1973; however, listing Sprague's pipits is precluded by higher listing priorities.

=== Habitat ===
They breed in habitat with minimal human disturbance, such as grazing, haying or other human development. Sprague's pipit is a ground nesting passerine and standing dead vegetation is used to build the canopy over the nest.

=== Reproduction ===
Breeding begins as early as late April and continues until mid to late August. Nests are a small cup of grass found on the ground with standing dead vegetation folded over to create a canopy. There is a single entrance to the nest. Four to six eggs are typically laid within the nests with an average incubation time of 13–14 days.

Renesting and second broods have been occasionally documented for Sprague's pipit, as has polygyny; however, they are predominantly single-brooded (Jones et al. 2010).

=== Diet ===
Sprague's pipits eat various insects, spiders, and sometimes seeds. During the breeding season, the adults are almost entirely insectivorous and feed the young on insects as well.

== Gallery ==
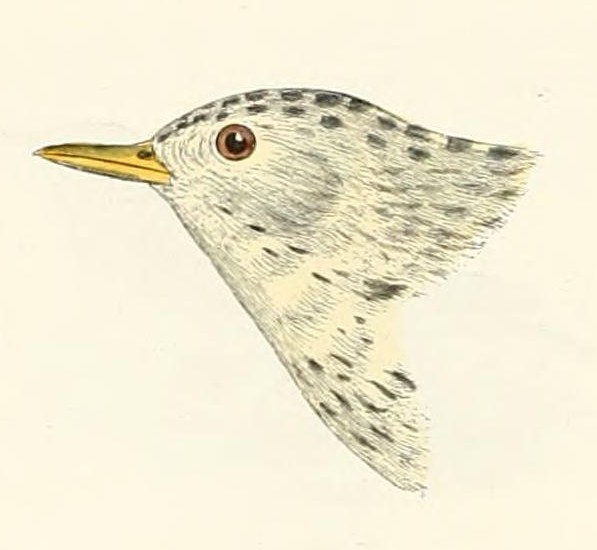
Sprague's pipit by J. G. Cooper, 1870

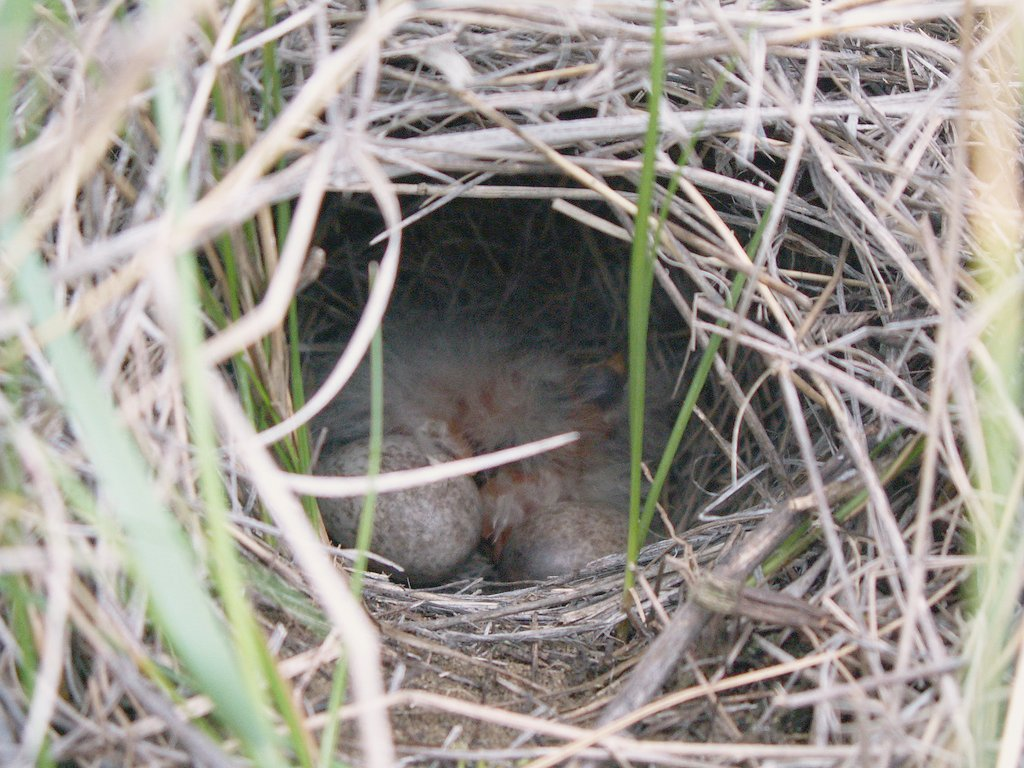
Nest with 2 eggs and 4 recently hatched chicks taken on CFB Suffield.
