= Isaac Sprague =

American painter (1811–1895)

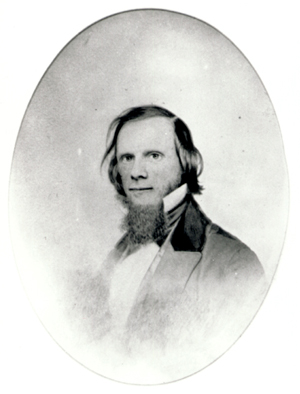
Isaac Sprague

Isaac Sprague (September 5, 1811 – 1895) was an American botanical and ornithological illustrator. He illustrated the works of botanists Asa Gray and John Torrey.

== Life ==
Sprague was born in Hingham, Massachusetts and apprenticed with his uncle as a carriage painter.

In 1840, a young Sprague met John James Audubon, who had admired Sprague's bird drawings. In 1843, Sprague served as an assistant to Audubon on an ornithological expedition up the Missouri River, taking measurements and making sketches. Sprague's pipit (Anthus spragueii), an uncommon and inconspicuous bird, was discovered on that expedition and named for Sprague. Some of Sprague's drawings were incorporated into Audubon's later publications, without credit. Sprague's diary of this expedition is in the Boston Athenaeum.

In 1845, Sprague met Asa Gray of Harvard College, and, over many years, Sprague illustrated several of Gray’s works, including the plates for the atlas (1857) to "Botany. Phanerogamia" in Charles Wilkes' United States Exploring Expedition During the Years 1838, 1839, 1840, 1841, 1842 (1845–1876). He also illustrated Asa Gray and John Torrey's various volumes of the U. S. War Department's Reports... (1855–1860), as well as works for George B. Emerson, George Goodale, and Alpheus Baker Hervey.

== Legacy ==
In 1960, the Houghton Library at Harvard University exhibited approximately 100 of Sprague’s paintings, drawings and illustrations. In 2003, Sprague's works were included in the Hunt Institute’s exhibition American Botanical Prints of Two Centuries.

Major collections of Sprague's work are held by the Boston Athenaeum, the Museum of Fine Arts (Boston), the Smithsonian Institution (on indefinite loan to the Hunt Institute for Botanical Verification, Carnegie Mellon University), and by Harvard University.

== Selected illustrations ==
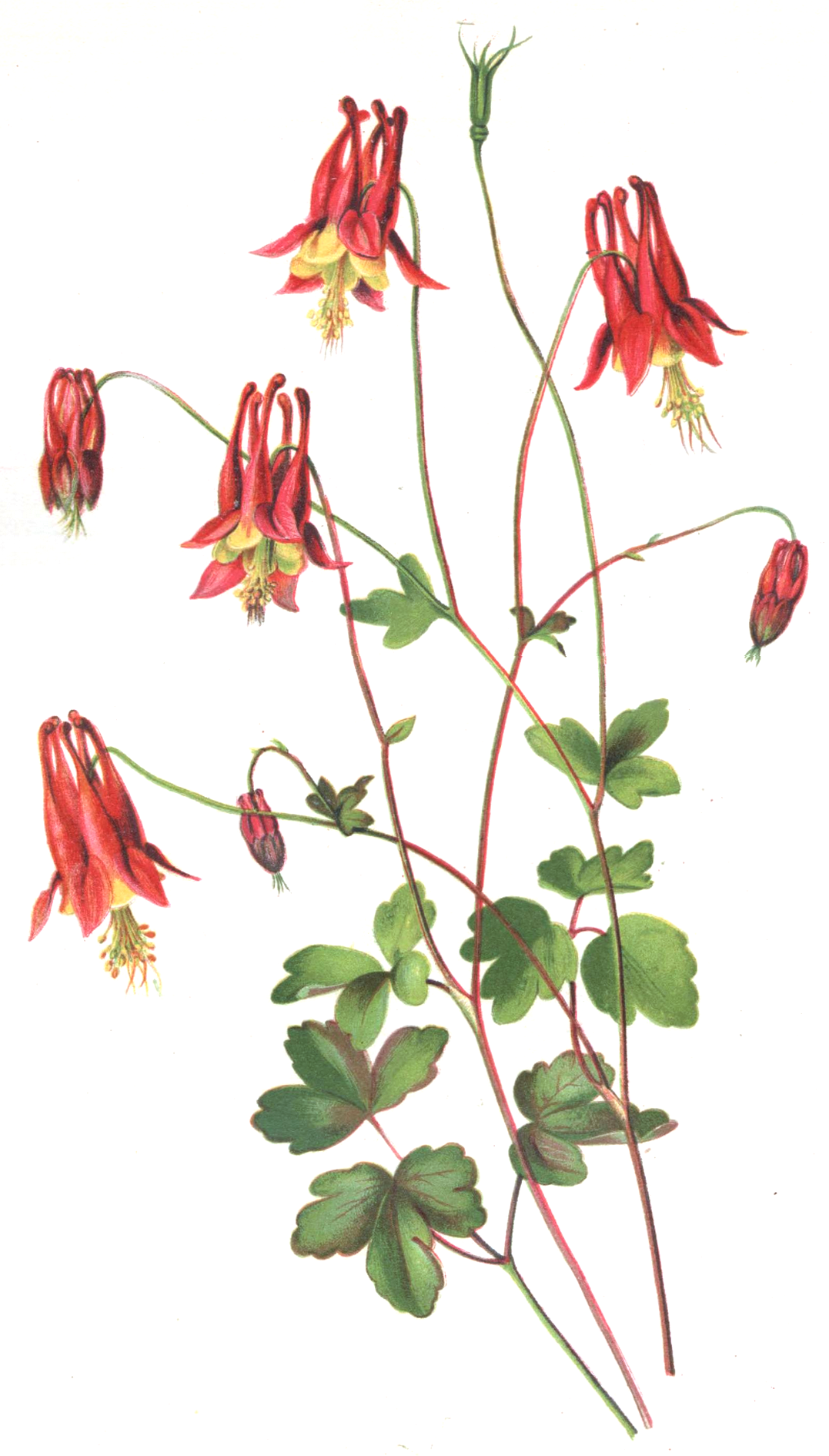
"Wild Columbine" (Aquilegia canadensis), from The Wild Flowers of America, 1886

- 1842 Botanical Text-book by Asa Gray
- 1856 Manual of the Botany of the Northern United States by Asa Gray, ed. 2
- 1848 White Mountain Scenery by William Oakes
- 1848-1849 Genera Florae Americae Boreali-Orientalis by Asa Gray
- 1855-1860 Reports of Explorations and Surveys, to Ascertain the Most Practicable and Economical Route for a Railroad Route from the Mississippi River to the Pacific Ocean, U. S. War Department
- 1875 Report on the Trees and Shrubs Growing Naturally in the Forests of Massachusetts, George B. Emerson, ed. 2
- 1876-1882 Wild Flowers of America by George Goodale
- 1882 Beautiful Wild Flowers of America by Alpheus Baker Hervey
- 1883 Flowers of Field and Forest by Alpheus Baker Hervey
- 1883 Wayside Flowers and Ferns by Alpheus Baker Hervey
