= Artis =

Artis may refer to:

== People ==
=== Surname ===
- Dominic Artis (born 1993), American basketball player
- Edmund Tyrell Artis (1789–1847), English archaeologist, palaebotanist, and geologist
- Jamareo Artis (born 1989), American bass guitarist
- Jamel Artis (born 1993), American basketball player
- Orsten Artis (1943–2017), American basketball player
- Rebecca Artis (born 1988), Australian professional golfer
- William Artis (1914–1977), American sculptor
- William Artis (1884–1957), British sports shooter

=== Given name ===
- Artis Ābols (born 1973), Latvian ice hockey player and coach
- Artis Ate (born 1989), Latvian basketball player
- Artis Gilmore (born 1949), American basketball player
- Artis Ivey Jr. or Coolio (1963–2022), American rapper, actor, chef, and record producer
- Artis Kampars (born 1967), Latvian politician and businessman
- Artis Lazdiņš (born 1986), Latvian footballer
- Artis Lane (born 1927), Canadian sculptor and painter
- Artis Pabriks (born 1966), Latvian politician
- Artis Rasmanis (born 1971), Latvian sidecarcross passenger

=== Stage name ===
- Artis the Spoonman (born 1948), American street performer from Seattle
- Kon Artis, a stage name of Denaun Porter (born 1978), American rapper, singer, songwriter, and record producer

== Other uses ==
- Artis (non-profit company), a non-profit art organization based in New York City
- Artis, LLC, a research company in Herndon, Virginia
- Artis Award, a Québécois television award
- Natura Artis Magistra, a zoo in Amsterdam, named after the founding Zoological Society
  - Artis Library, a library within the grounds of the zoo but now part of the University of Amsterdam

== See also ==
- Ars Gratia Artis, a Latin phrase meaning art for art's sake
- Arti (disambiguation)
- Cameron Artis-Payne (born 1990), American football running back
