= Asa Gray =

American botanist (1810–1888)

Asa Gray ForMemRS
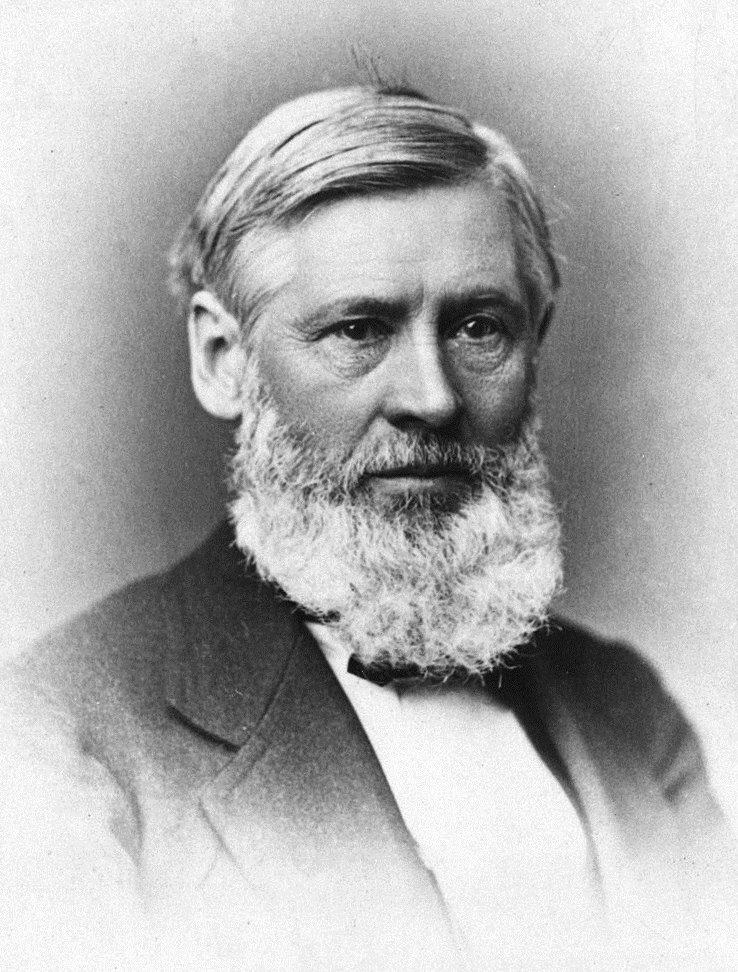
- Gray in the 1870s
- Born: November 18, 1810; Sauquoit, New York, U.S.
- Died: January 30, 1888 (aged 77); Cambridge, Massachusetts, U.S.
- Education: Fairfield Academy
- Spouse: Jane Loring (m. 1848)
- Scientific career
- Fields: Botany
- Workplaces: University of Michigan; Harvard University
- Author abbrev. (botany): A.Gray

Asa Gray (November 18, 1810 – January 30, 1888) was an American botanist who was considered the most important American botanist of the 19th century. His Darwiniana (1876) was considered by some as an important explanation of how religion and science were not necessarily mutually exclusive. Gray was adamant that a genetic connection must exist between all members of a species. He was also strongly opposed to the ideas of hybridization within one generation and special creation in the sense of its not allowing for evolution. Gray was a strong supporter of Darwin while at the same time being a proponent of theistic evolution.

As a professor of botany at Harvard University for several decades, Gray regularly visited, and corresponded with, many of the leading natural scientists of the era, including Charles Darwin, who held great regard for him. Gray made several trips to Europe to collaborate with leading European scientists of the era, as well as trips to the southern and western United States. He also built an extensive network of specimen collectors.

A prolific writer, he was instrumental in unifying the taxonomic knowledge of the plants of North America. Of Gray's many works on botany, the most popular was his Manual of the Botany of the Northern United States, from New England to Wisconsin and South to Ohio and Pennsylvania Inclusive, known today simply as Gray's Manual. Gray was the sole author of the first five editions of the book and co-author of the sixth, with botanical illustrations by Isaac Sprague. Further editions have been published, and it remains a standard in the field. Gray also worked extensively on a phenomenon that is now called the Asa Gray disjunction, namely, the surprising morphological similarities between many eastern Asian and eastern North American plants. Several structures, geographic features, and plants have been named after Gray.

In 1848, Gray was elected as a member of the American Philosophical Society.

== Early life and education ==
Gray was born in Sauquoit, New York, on November 18, 1810, to Moses Gray (b. February 26, 1786), (Note: Gray's father's name was Moses Gray. Moses Wiley Gray was the younger Moses's father, Asa Gray's grandfather; Asa Gray's father's name is also often reported as Moses Wiley Gray.) then a tanner, and Roxanna Howard Gray (b. March 15, 1789). Born in the back of his father's tannery, Gray was the eldest of their eight children. Gray's paternal great-grandfather had arrived in Boston from Northern Ireland in 1718; Gray's Scotch-Irish Presbyterian ancestors had moved to New York from Massachusetts and Vermont after Shays's Rebellion. His parents married on July 30, 1809. Tanneries needed a lot of wood to burn, and the lumber supply in the area had been shrinking, so Gray's father used his profits to buy farms in the area, and in about 1823 sold the tannery and became a farmer.

Gray was an avid reader even in his youth. He completed Clinton Grammar School from about 1823 to 1825, in those years reading many books from the nearby library at Hamilton College. In 1825 he enrolled at Fairfield Academy, switching to its Fairfield Medical College, also known as the Medical College of the Western District of Fairfield, in autumn 1826. (Note: This is sometimes mis-reported as 1829, but Gray himself wrote that it was 1826.) It was during this time that Gray began to mount botanical specimens. On a trip to New York City, he attempted to meet with John Torrey to get assistance in identifying specimens, but Torrey was not home, so Gray left the specimens at Torrey's house. Torrey was so impressed with Gray's specimens that he began a correspondence with him. Gray graduated and became an M.D. in February 1831, even though he was not yet 21 years of age, which was a requirement at the time. Although Gray did open a medical office in Bridgewater, New York, where he had served an apprenticeship with Doctor John Foote Trowbridge while he was in medical school, he never truly practiced medicine, as he enjoyed botany more. It was around this time that he began making explorations in New York and New Jersey. By autumn 1831, he had all but given up his medical practice to devote more time to botany.

In 1832 he was hired to teach chemistry, mineralogy, and botany at Bartlett's High School in Utica, New York, and at Fairfield Medical School, replacing instructors who had died in mid-term. Agreeing to teach for one year, with a break from August to December 1832, Gray had to cancel his plans for an expedition to Mexico, which at the time included what is now the southwestern United States. Gray first met Torrey in person in September 1832, and they went on an expedition to New Jersey. After completing his teaching assignment in Utica on August 1, 1833, Gray became an assistant to Torrey at the College of Physicians and Surgeons in New York City. By this time, Gray was corresponding and trading specimens with botanists not just in America, but also in Asia, Europe, and the Pacific Islands. Gray held a temporary teaching position in 1834 at Hamilton College. In 1834 and 1835 he issued the exsiccata North American Gramineae and Cyperaceae in 2 parts. The specimen series is now housed in major herbaria worldwide Due to funding shortages, in 1835 Gray was obliged to leave his job as Torrey's assistant, and in February or March 1836 became curator and librarian at the Lyceum of Natural History in New York, now called the New York Academy of Sciences. He had an apartment in their new building in Manhattan. Torrey's attempt to get Gray a job at Princeton University was unsuccessful, as were other attempts to find him a position in science. Despite Gray no longer being his assistant, Torrey and Gray became lifelong friends and colleagues. Torrey's wife, Eliza Torrey, had a profound impact upon Gray in his manners, tastes, habits, and religious life.

== Career ==
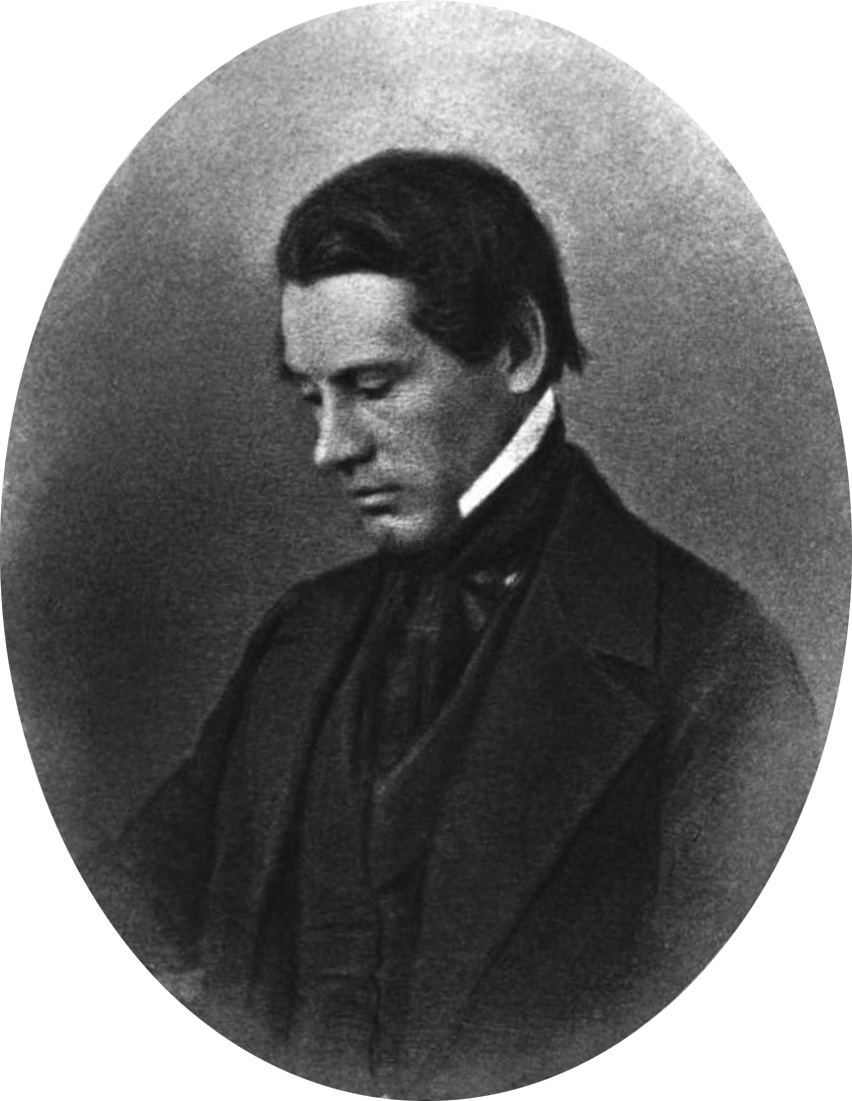
Gray in 1841

In October 1836 Gray was selected to be one of the botanists on the United States Exploring Expedition (1838–1842), also known as the "Wilkes Expedition", which was supposed to last three years. Gray began getting paid well for his work preparing and planning for this expedition, even to the point of loading supplies onto a ship in New York harbor. However, the expedition was fraught with politics, bickering, turmoil, inefficiency, and delays. Referring to the Secretary of the Navy, Mahlon Dickerson, Gray wrote of "abominable management & stupidity". Despite this, Gray resigned from the Lyceum in April 1837 to devote his time to the preparations. By 1838 the expedition was in utter turmoil. The new state of Michigan was starting its university, and Gray applied for a professorship in early 1838. He resigned from the Wilkes Expedition on July 10, 1838. In 1848 Gray was hired to work on the botanical specimens, and published the first volume of the report on botany in 1854, but Wilkes was unable to secure the funding for the second volume.

On July 17, 1838, Gray became the very first permanent paid professor at the newly founded University of Michigan, although in the event he never taught classes. His position was also the first one devoted solely to botany at any educational institution in America. Appointed Professor of Botany and Zoology, Gray was dispatched to Europe by the regents of the university for the purpose of purchasing a suitable array of books to form the university's library, and equipment such as microscopes to aid research. Botanist Charles F. Jenkins states that the main purpose of this trip was to examine American flora in Europe's herbariums. Gray departed on the packet ship Philadelphia on November 9, 1838, sailing through The Narrows out of New York Harbor nine days before his 28th birthday. Gray and the regents were both involved in stocking the university library. In 1839 the regents purchased a complete copy of Audubon's The Birds of America for the then-extraordinary sum of $970. Gray's first stop was in Glasgow, visiting William Hooker, who aided and financially supported many botanists, including Gray. On January 16, 1839, he arrived in London and stayed until March 14. He then spent time in Paris, where he collaborated with Joseph Decaisne at the Jardin des Plantes. In mid-April 1839 he left Paris for Italy by way of southern France, then visiting Genoa, Rome, Florence, Venice, Bologna, Padua, and Trieste. After Italy, Gray went to Vienna, Austria. While in Vienna, he spent twelve days studying specimen collections and gardens with Stephan Endlicher, who also introduced him to other local botanists. In 1840 Endlicher became director of the Botanical Garden of the University of Vienna. Departing Austria, Gray went to Munich, Zürich, and Geneva, where he met the prominent botanist Augustin Pyramus de Candolle, who died in 1841. Gray continued extensive collaboration with de Candolle's son Alphonse Pyramus de Candolle. Gray returned to Germany, going to Freiburg, Tübingen, Dresden, Halle, and then Berlin, where he stayed for a month. While in Berlin, he spent most of his time in Schöneberg, where the region's Botanical Gardens were then located. Gray then returned to London by way of Hamburg. Gray admitted he just managed some of the book purchasing and that he delegated the actual buying of books to George Palmer Putnam, who was then living in London. Gray spent a year in Europe, leaving for America from Portsmouth, England, aboard the sailing ship Toronto on October 1, 1839, and arriving back in New York on November 4. Gray, together with his agents, eventually purchased about 3,700 books for the University of Michigan library. The regents at the University of Michigan were so impressed by Gray's work in Europe, including his spending about $1,500 of his own money on specimen collections, that they granted him another year's salary that covered him until the summer of 1841. However, finances at the university were so bad that they asked him to resign in April 1840.

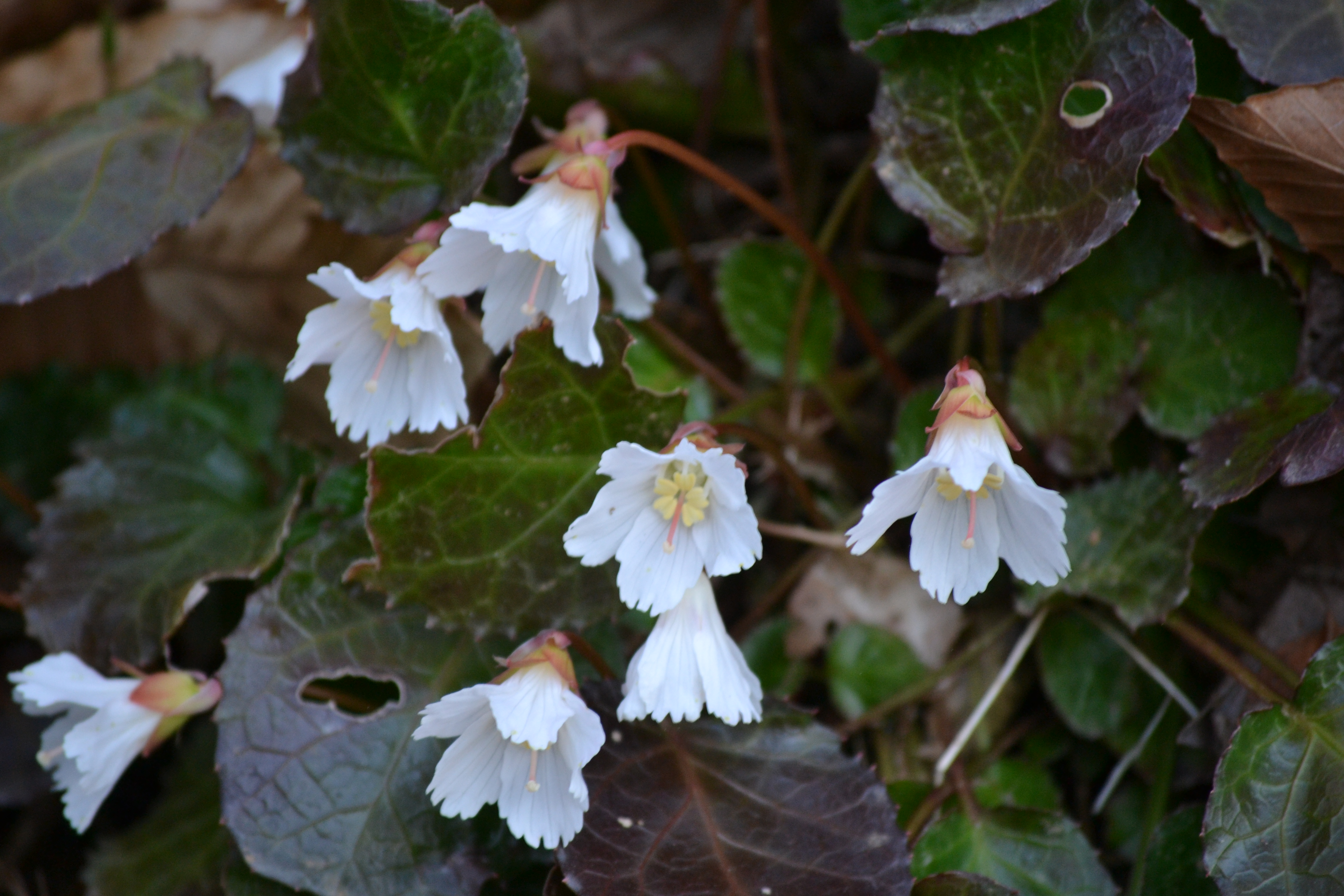
Shortia galacifolia, which Gray named

While he was in Paris at the Jardin des Plantes, Gray saw an unnamed dried specimen, collected by André Michaux, and named it Shortia galacifolia. He spent considerable time and effort over the next 38 years looking for a specimen in the wild. The first such expedition was in late June to late July 1841 to an area near Jefferson, Ashe County, North Carolina. His further expeditions searching for this species were also unsuccessful, including one in 1876. In May 1877 a North Carolina herb collector found a specimen but did not know what it was. Eighteen months later the collector sent it to Joseph Whipple Congdon, who contacted Gray, telling Gray that he felt he had found Shortia. Gray was ecstatic to confirm this when he saw the specimen in October 1878. In spring 1879 Gray led an expedition, in which the collector helped, to the spot where S. galacifolia had been found. Gray never saw the species in the wild in bloom, but made a final trip to this region in 1884.

=== Harvard professor ===
Both Gray and Torrey were elected to the American Academy of Arts and Sciences in December 1841. Gray never returned to teach a course at Michigan. In 1833 Dr. Joshua Fisher, a resident of Beverly, Massachusetts, and a Harvard University alumnus, bequeathed $20,000 to Harvard to endow a chair in natural history. The university allowed the proceeds to accumulate until it could fund a full year's salary for a professor. Because of this and a few problems in finding a suitable professor, this chair was not filled until it was formally offered to Gray on March 26, 1842. The offer was $1,000/year salary, teaching duties limited to only botany, and being superintendent of Harvard's botanic garden. While the salary was low, the teaching limitation, rare for the time, allowed him plenty of time to do research and work in the botanic garden. After an exchange of letters, Gray accepted this appointment as Fisher Professor of Natural History at Harvard. The formal appointment was made April 30, 1842. Gray arrived at Harvard on July 22, 1842, and began his duties in September. He did not have to teach in the fall of 1842, but began in spring 1843, the first classes he had taught in nine years. Early in his years at Harvard, Gray had to borrow money from his father. Soon he was able to repay his father and help his family by supplementing his income giving lectures outside of Harvard, including at the Lowell Institute. Gray was considered a weak lecturer, but because of his expert knowledge, he was highly regarded by his peers. His skills were better suited to teaching advanced rather than introductory classes. He was also known for his textbooks and high quality illustrations. Gray moved into what became known as the Asa Gray House in the Botanic Garden in the summer of 1844. It had been built in 1810 for William Dandridge Peck and later occupied by Thomas Nuttall. As the demands of teaching, collecting, selling specimens, taking care of the herbarium, and writing books increased and he himself was not a good illustrator, Gray found it necessary to hire a botanical illustrator – Isaac Sprague, who illustrated much of Gray's works for decades to come.

By June 1848 many of the specimens from the Wilkes Expedition had been damaged or lost. Many were still not classified or published, as the mismanagement and bungling that had plagued the expedition before it ever departed continued. While on a trip to Washington, D.C., that month with his new bride, Gray was hired to study the botanical specimens for five years. This included a year in Europe, with his wife, using the facilities at the herbariums in Europe. Mr. and Mrs. Gray departed for England on June 11, 1850. They spent the summer traveling to Belgium, Switzerland, Germany, and the Netherlands. Gray then set down to work on the expedition's plant sheets at the estate of botanist George Bentham, whom he had met eleven years earlier, and then with William Henry Harvey in Ireland. Gray returned to England and settled into a routine at the Royal Botanic Gardens, Kew. The couple was back in America on September 4, 1851. In the meantime, a dispute had arisen between Wilkes and the team of Torrey and Gray about the format of the books resulting from the expedition. Gray almost hired his father-in-law to break the contract. This dispute largely centered on the use of Latin and English. Wilkes wanted a literal Latin to English translation while Torrey and Gray wanted a looser one because they felt that technical English terms were equally incomprehensible to the public. Much of the work was stymied or burned in fires.

In 1855, Torrey and Gray contributed a "Report on the Botany of the Expedition" to Volume II of the Reports of Explorations and Surveys to ascertain the most practicable and economical route for a railroad from the Mississippi River to the Pacific Ocean (known as the Pacific Railroad Surveys). The Report included a catalogue of plants collected along with 10 black and white plates for illustration.

During the late summer of 1855, Gray made his third trip to Europe. This was an emergency trip to bring his ill brother-in-law home from Paris. Gray spent only three weeks in London and Paris, and on the way back he read the newly published Géographie botanique raisonnée by Alphonse de Candolle. This was a ground-breaking book that for the first time brought together the large mass of data being collected by the expeditions of the time. The natural sciences had become highly specialized, yet this book synthesized them to explain living organisms within their environment and why plants were distributed the way they were, all upon a geologic scale. Gray instantly saw that this brought taxonomic botany into focus.

Despite Gray constantly seeking collectors and people to help him with the Harvard herbarium, in the first fifteen years he was at Harvard, no graduate entered botany as a career. This changed in 1858 with the arrival of Daniel Cady Eaton, who had graduated from Yale University in 1857 and came to Harvard to study with Gray. Eaton later returned to Yale to be a botany professor and oversee its herbarium, just as Gray did at Harvard. Daniel Eaton was the grandson of Amos Eaton, whose textbooks Gray had studied during his college days. Eaton influenced the teaching style of Gray, and both required practical work of their students. Gray retained the Fisher post until 1873 while living in the Asa Gray House.

In 1859 Gray was elected a foreign member of the Royal Swedish Academy of Sciences. The National Academy of Sciences was created by Congress on March 3, 1863, and he was one of the original 50 members. In 1864 Gray donated 200,000 plant specimens and 2,200 books to Harvard with the condition that the herbarium and garden be built. This effectively created the botany department at Harvard, and the Gray Herbarium was named after him. He was president of the American Association for the Advancement of Science in 1872 and of the American Academy of Arts and Sciences 1863–1873. Gray was also a regent at the Smithsonian Institution in 1874–1888 and a foreign member of the Royal Society of London in 1873.

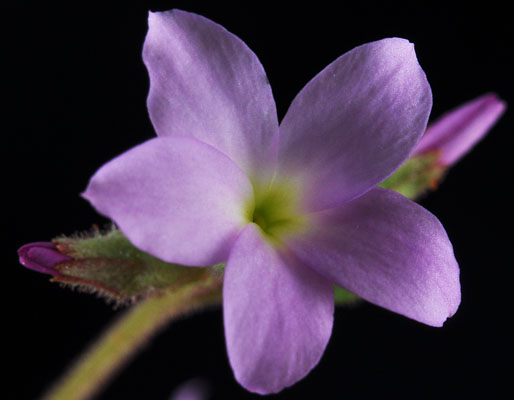
Suksdorfia violacea, the type species of its genus

The Elements of Botany (1836), an introductory textbook, was the first of Gray's many works. In this book Gray espoused the idea that botany was useful not only to medicine, but also to farmers. Gray and Torrey published the Flora of North America together in 1838. By the mid-1850s the demands of teaching, research, gardening, collecting, and corresponding had become so great, and he had become so influential, that Gray wrote two high school-level texts in the late 1850s: First Lessons in Botany and Vegetable Physiology (1857) and How Plants Grow: A Simple Introduction to Structural Botany (1858). The publishers pressured Gray to make these two books non-technical enough so that high school students and non-scientists could understand them. As with most scientists in American academic institutions, Gray found it difficult to concentrate purely on research.

Gray met physician and botanist George Engelmann in the early 1840s, and they remained friends and colleagues until Engelmann died in 1884. Torrey was an early American supporter of the "natural system of classification", which relies upon geography and a plant's entire structure, and as his assistant, Gray was a proponent of this system, too. This contrasts with Linnaeus' artificial classification, which was designed for ease of use and focused on readily observed aspects of a plant, particularly the differences in the flowers. Amos Eaton was also a proponent of the artificial system. Gray was so impressed with Wilhelm Nikolaus Suksdorf, a largely self-taught immigrant from Germany who specialized in the flora of the Pacific Northwest, that he had Suksdorf come to Harvard to be his assistant and named the genus Suksdorfia after him.

Gray was a leading opponent of the Scientific Lazzaroni, a group of mostly physical scientists who wanted American academia to mimic the autocratic academic structures of European universities. A large percentage of the original 50 members of the National Academy of Sciences were Lazzaroni members. The American Academy of Arts and Sciences was opposed to the National Academy and collectively elected Gray and his friend, colleague, and fellow Charles Darwin supporter William Barton Rogers to the National Academy. Rogers founded the Massachusetts Institute of Technology. This is one of the areas where Gray and his friend and colleague, Louis Agassiz, were in disagreement; Agassiz was a member of the Lazzaroni group. Agassiz had come to lecture at the Lowell Institute in 1846 and got hired by Harvard in 1847. Gray befriended him the way he had been befriended during his trip to Europe.

Gray abhorred slavery. In his view, science proved the unity of all man because all human races can interbreed and produce fertile offspring, i.e., all members of a species are connected genetically. He also felt Christianity taught the unity of man. He was not an abolitionist, feeling it was more important to preserve the Union, yet he also felt if the South persevered in the conflict, every slave should be set free, by use of more force if necessary. However, he was not sure what should be done with the freed slaves. This was another area where Gray and Agassiz disagreed; Agassiz felt each race had different origins.

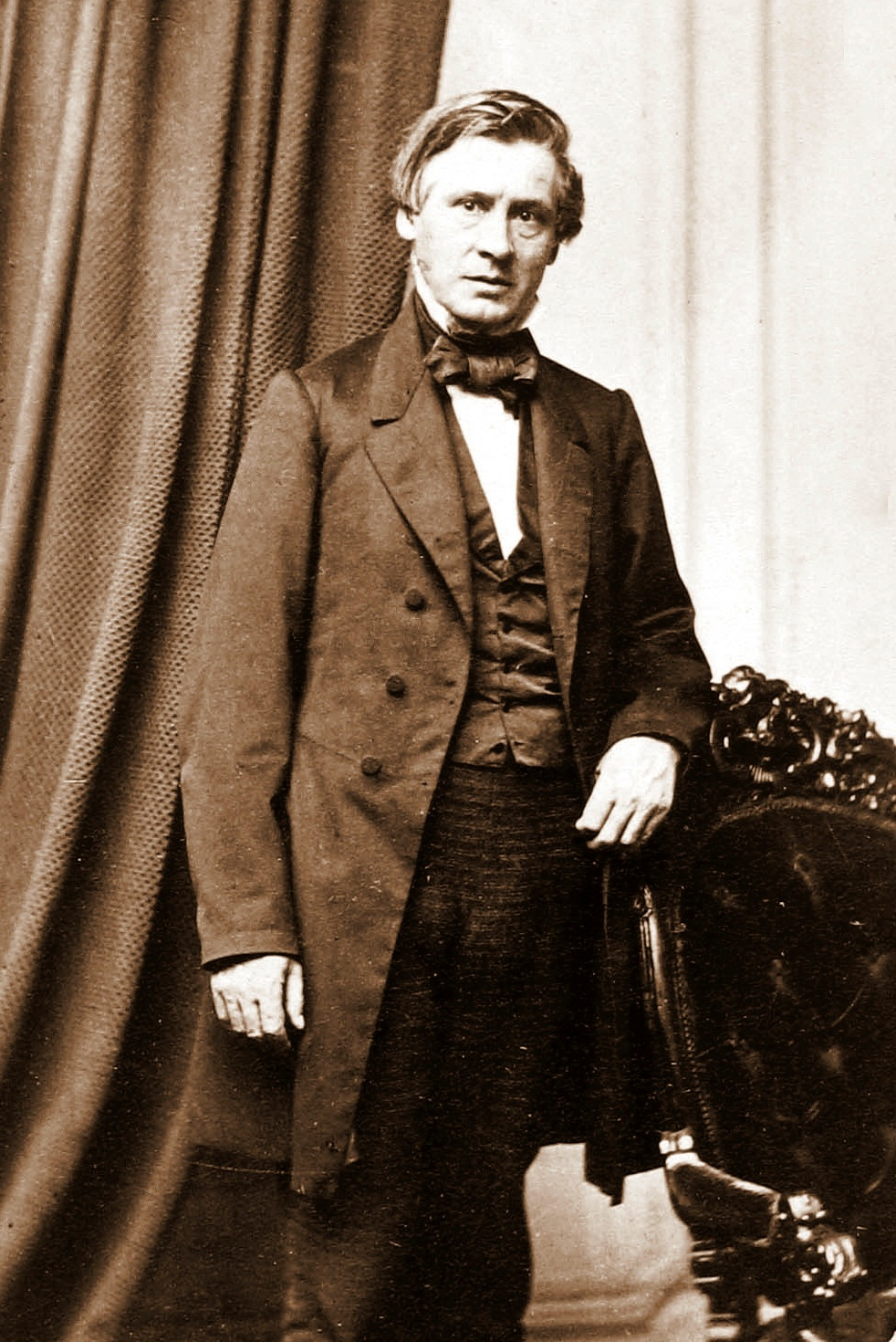
Photograph by John Adams Whipple, 1864

During the American Civil War, Gray was a steadfast supporter of the North and the Republican Party. About February 1861 – two months before the war started – Gray lost part of his left thumb, just above the base of the nail, in an accident in the garden. Despite now being 50 years old, he regretted that this accident ended his "fighting days". After hostilities began, he joined a company that guarded the Massachusetts State Arsenal in Cambridge. He also bought war bonds, was surprised more people did not do likewise, and supported a 5% tax to support the war. Gray regretted not having children because he had "no son to send to the war". Gray considered Abraham Lincoln as a second George Washington because of the way he managed to preserve the Union during the war. He also predicted that the fate of slavery depended upon the length and bitterness of the war, and the longer it lasted the more disastrous it would be for the South. As a corollary, he felt that if the South had given up early in the war, they would have had a chance of preserving slavery longer. Regarding his botanical endeavors, the war sundered his supply of information and specimens from the South. Even the Southern botanists who supported the North, such as Alvan Wentworth Chapman and Thomas Minott Peters, were soon forced to cease communications with Gray. It was during the war that Gray first began to think of retiring from his professorial duties so he could concentrate on completing Flora of North America.

Harvard was able to secure substantial new funding for its botanical programs in the years after the war, but Gray encountered significant trouble finding a suitable replacement for his professorial duties. The American university system had failed to train replacements for its professors. Only Harvard and Yale had botany programs, and in the war and pre-war years there had been few botany students. However, after the war there was an upswing in the numbers of botany students. Gray was grooming Horace Mann Jr. as his replacement, but he died of tuberculosis at the age of 24 in November 1868.

Growing weary of his workload, Gray and his wife departed on a trip to Britain, Egypt (for three months), and Switzerland in September 1868. It was during the winter spent in Egypt that Gray first grew his white beard. They returned in autumn 1869. In early 1872 Gray tried to resign his professorship and garden duties still with no replacement for himself. He proposed only looking after the herbarium and writing books in exchange for the rent of the house in which he and his wife lived on the university grounds. Due to the way the finances of the funding sources were handled and the lack of a replacement, Gray was unable to resign at that time.

In late 1872 Charles Sprague Sargent was appointed director of the Botanic Garden, the newly constructed Arnold Arboretum, and new botany-related buildings. This freed up much of Gray's time. Also, late in 1872, Ignatius Sargent, Charles' father, and Horatio Hollis Hunnewell both agreed to donate $500 yearly each to support Gray so that he could devote "undivided attention" to completing Flora of North America. This is what finally allowed Gray to resign his professorship and devote all his time to research and writing.

Harvard had so much trouble finding a replacement for Gray that they considered hiring a European, but they found an American and hired George Lincoln Goodale in late 1872. Goodale had a medical degree from Harvard and a solid knowledge of botany. By late June 1873 Goodale had enough experience that Gray was excited to pronounce he had taught his last class. William Gilson Farlow also had a medical degree from Harvard and had studied botany. He became Gray's assistant in 1870 after obtaining his medical degree and then studied in Europe for a few years. He returned to Harvard in 1874 and became a botany professor. Sereno Watson began helping Gray with taxonomy in 1872 and became the herbarium curator. The reorganization of botany at Harvard in the early 1870s was a major accomplishment of Gray's.

=== "Asa Gray disjunction" ===
Gray worked extensively on a phenomenon that is now called the "Asa Gray disjunction", namely, the surprising morphological similarities between many eastern Asian and eastern North American plants. In fact, Gray felt the flora of eastern North America is more similar to the flora of Japan than it is to the flora of western North America, but more recent studies have shown this is not so. While Gray was not the first botanist to notice this (it was first noticed in the early 18th century), beginning in the early 1840s he brought scientific focus to the issue. He was the first scientist in the world to possess the requisite knowledge set to do so as he had intimate knowledge of the northeast and southeast United States as well as eastern Asia – due to several contacts he had there. The phenomenon involves about 65 genera and is not limited to plants, but also includes fungi, arachnids, millipedes, insects, and freshwater fishes. It was believed that each pair of species might be international sister species, but it is now known that this is not generally the case; the species involved are less closely related to one another. Today, botanists suggest three possible causes for the observed morphological similarity, which probably developed at different times and via different pathways; the species pairs are: (1) the products of similar environmental conditions in separate locations, (2) relics of species that were formerly widely distributed but diversified later, (3) not as morphologically similar as was previously believed. Gray's work in this area gave significant support to Darwin's theory of evolution and is one of the hallmarks of Gray's career. In 1880 David P. Penhallow was accepted by Gray as a research assistant. Penhallow aided in Gray's work regarding the distribution of northern hemisphere plants, and in 1882 Gray recommended Penhallow as a lecturer to Sir John Dawson of McGill University in Montreal, Quebec, Canada.

=== Later career ===
Despite no longer having the burden of his professorial and garden duties, by the late 1870s the burden of maintaining himself as the pillar of American botany prevented Gray from the progress he desired on Synoptical Flora of North America, the follow-on to Flora of North America. This burden consisted of the fact that other scientists often only accepted Gray's word on a botanical matter, and the number of incoming specimens to identify was increasing vastly: numbers had to be assigned to them, collectors needed to be corresponded with, and preliminary papers had to be published. By the early 1880s, Gray's home was the center of everything to do with botany in America. Every aspiring botanist came to see him, even if just to look at him through his window.

After turning over his non-research duties to Sargent, Goodale, Farlow, and Watson, Gray concentrated more on research and writing, especially on plant taxonomy, as well as lecturing around the country, largely promoting Darwinian ideas. Many of his lectures during this time were given at the Yale Divinity School. Liberty Hyde Bailey worked as Gray's herbarium assistant for two years during 1883–1884.

In spring 1887 Gray and his wife made their last trip to Europe, this one for six months from April to October, primarily to see Hooker.

Gray received the following advanced degrees: honorary degree of Master of Arts (1844) and Doctor of Laws (1875) from Harvard, and Doctor of Laws from Hamilton College (New York) (1860), McGill University (1884), and the University of Michigan (1887).

== Research regarding the American West ==
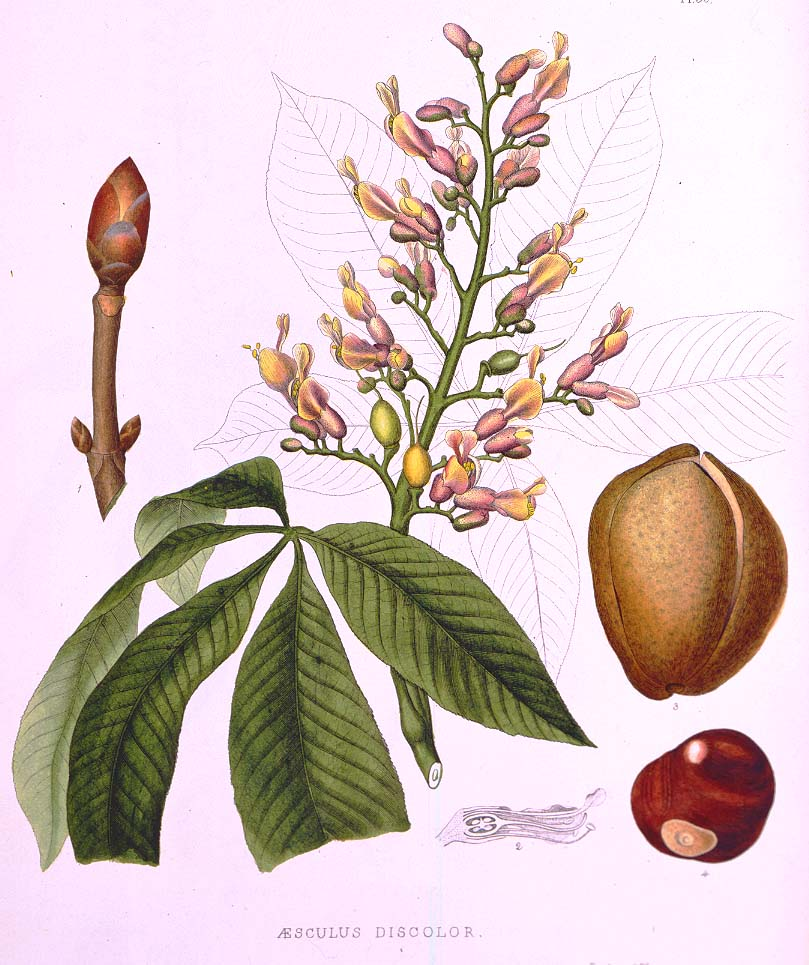
Aesculus discolor by Gray, from Plates Prepared between the Years 1849 and 1859 to Accompany a Report on the Forest Trees of North America

Prior to 1840, besides what he had discovered during his trip to Europe, Gray's knowledge of the flora of the American West was limited to what he could learn from Edwin James, who had been on the expedition to the West of Major Stephen Harriman Long, and from Thomas Nuttall, who had been on an expedition to the Pacific coast with Nathaniel Jarvis Wyeth. In the latter half of 1840, Gray met the German-American botanist and physician George Engelmann in New York City. Engelmann took frequent trips to explore the American West and northern Mexico. The two remained close friends and botanical collaborators. Engelmann would send specimens to Gray, who would classify them and act as a sales agent. Their collaborations greatly enhanced botanical knowledge of those areas. Another German-American botanist, Ferdinand Lindheimer, collaborated with both Engelmann and Gray, focusing on collecting plants in Texas, hoping to find specimens with "no Latin names". This cooperation resulted in issuing the exsiccata-like series Lindheimer Flora Texana exsiccata. Another long-term and productive collaboration was with Charles Wright, who collected in Texas and New Mexico on two separate expeditions in 1849 and 1851–1852. These trips resulted in publication of the two-volume Plantae Wrightianae in 1852–1853.

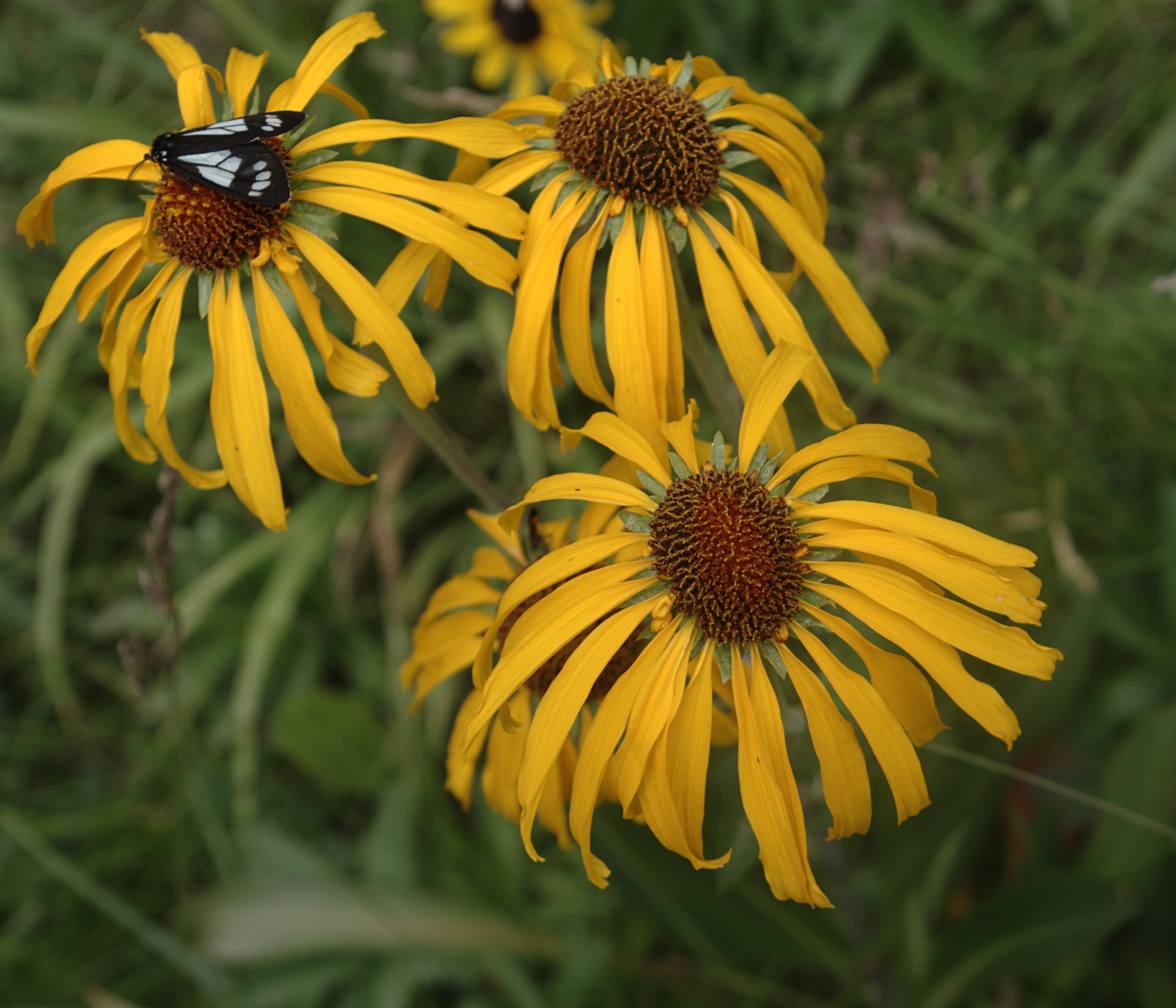
Hymenoxys hoopesii (owl's claws), an example of Plummera named by Gray

Gray traveled to the American West on two separate occasions, the first in 1872 by train, and then again with Joseph Dalton Hooker, son of William Hooker, in 1877. His wife accompanied him on both trips. Both times his goal was botanical research, and he avidly collected plant specimens to bring back with him to Harvard. On his second trip through the American West, he and Hooker reportedly collected over 1,000 specimens. Gray's and Hooker's research was reported in their joint 1880 publication, "The Vegetation of the Rocky Mountain Region and a Comparison with that of Other Parts of the World," which appeared in volume six of Hayden's Bulletin of the United States Geological and Geophysical Survey of the Territories.

On both trips he climbed Grays Peak, one of Colorado's many fourteeners. His wife climbed Grays Peak with him in 1872. This mountain was named after Gray by the botanist and explorer of the Rocky Mountains Charles Christopher Parry.

Prior to the 1870s, collecting in the western part of the country required slow horses, wagons, and often military escorts. But by this time, permanent settlements and railroads resulted in so many specimens coming in that Gray alone could not keep up with them. One of the post-war collectors who worked extensively with Gray was John Gill Lemmon, husband of fellow botanist Sara Plummer Lemmon. Gray named a new genus Plummera, now called Hymenoxys, in Sara's honor.

== Relationship with Darwin ==
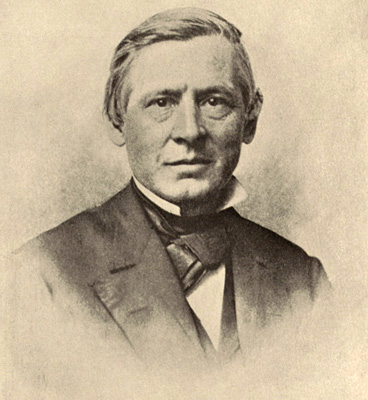
Gray in 1867

Gray and Joseph Dalton Hooker went to visit Richard Owen at London's Hunterian Museum in January 1839. Gray met Charles Darwin during lunch that day at Kew Gardens, apparently introduced by Hooker. Darwin found a kindred spirit in Gray, as they both had an empirical approach to science, and first wrote to him in April 1855. During 1855–1881 they exchanged about 300 letters. Darwin then wrote to Gray requesting information about the distribution of various species of American flowers, which Gray provided, and which was helpful for the development of Darwin's theory. This was the beginning of an extensive lifelong correspondence. Gray, Darwin, and Hooker became lifelong friends and colleagues, and Gray and Hooker conducted research on Darwin's behalf in 1877 on their Rocky Mountain expedition. After Hooker returned to England and reported to Darwin on their adventure, Darwin wrote back to Gray: "I have just ... heard prodigies of your strength & activity. That you run up a mountain like a cat!"

Before 1846, Gray had been firmly opposed to the idea of transmutation of species, in which simpler forms naturally become more complex over time, including via hybridization. By the early 1850s, Gray had clearly defined his concept that the species is the basic unit of taxonomy. This was partly the result of the 1831–1836 voyage during which Darwin discovered the differentiation of species among the various Galápagos Islands. Local geography could produce variances, like in the Galápagos and Hawaii, which Gray did not get to study in depth as he had wanted. Gray was insistent that a genetic connection must exist between all members of a species, that like begat like. This concept was critical to Darwin's theories. Gray was also strongly opposed to the ideas of hybridization within one generation and special creation in the sense of its not allowing for evolution.

When Darwin received Alfred Russel Wallace's paper that described natural selection, Hooker and Charles Lyell arranged for a joint reading of papers by Darwin and Wallace to the Linnean Society on July 1, 1858. Since Darwin had nothing prepared, the reading included excerpts from his 1844 Essay and from a letter he had sent to Asa Gray in July 1857 outlining his theory on the origin of species. By that time, Darwin had begun writing his book On the Origin of Species. The correspondence with Gray was thus a key piece of evidence in establishing Darwin's intellectual priority with respect to the theory of evolution by natural selection. Neither Darwin nor Wallace attended the meeting. The papers were published by the society as On the Tendency of Species to form Varieties; and on the Perpetuation of Varieties and Species by Natural Means of Selection. By summer 1859 it was obvious to Gray and others working with Darwin that On the Origin of Species would be a ground-breaking book.

Darwin published On the Origin of Species on November 24, 1859. The first printing was 1,250 copies, with some having been sent to America via ship, one of which was for Gray. Gray's copy arrived just before Christmas, and he read it between Christmas and New Year. Since there was no international copyright law at the time, Gray worked to protect the book from publishing piracy. According to American law at the time, a copyright could only be secured by an American edition being published by an American citizen, and royalties were not required to be paid to the author. Gray arranged the first American edition of On the Origin of Species and was able to negotiate royalties on Darwin's behalf. Gray took a 5% royalty from the publisher, and Darwin was so grateful for Gray's efforts that he offered Gray some of his royalties. Darwin held Gray in high esteem: he dedicated his book Forms of Flowers (1877) to Gray, and he wrote in 1881, "there is hardly any one in the world whose approbation I value more highly than I do yours." Seeing the "unity we perceive in nature" and law in the universe, regarding all species he felt "that they not only had a Creator but have a Governor." Gray and Agassiz strongly disagreed; Agassiz was adamantly opposed to the idea of evolution, whereas Gray was a staunch supporter, believing in theistic evolution. As the debate raged over Darwin's theories, the rift between Gray and Agassiz grew deeper, and they were estranged by December 1863, when Gray was elected president of the American Academy of Arts and Sciences, which also marked Agassiz' increasing isolation within the scientific community. Gray showed little interest in scientific politics and resigned from the National Academy of Sciences in 1867. In late 1866 Agassiz apologized to Gray and the two were at least civil to one another again.

Gray, considered by Darwin to be his friend and "best advocate", also attempted to convince Darwin in his letters that design was inherent in all forms of life, and to return to his faith. Gray saw nature as filled with "unmistakable and irresistible indications of design" and argued that "God himself is the very last, irreducible causal factor and, hence, the source of all evolutionary change." Darwin agreed that his theories were "not at all necessarily atheistical" but was unable to share Gray's belief. "I feel most deeply that the whole subject is too profound for the human intellect. A dog might as well speculate on the mind of Newton," he wrote. Gray was a Christian, but he was a staunch supporter of Darwin in America. He collected together a number of his own writings to produce an influential book, Darwiniana (1876); these essays argued for a conciliation between Darwinian evolution and the tenets of theism, at a time when many on both sides perceived the two as mutually exclusive. Gray denied that investigation of physical causes stood opposed to the theological view and the study of the harmonies between mind and Nature, and thought it "most presumable that an intellectual conception realized in Nature would be realized through natural agencies". The result of all this is that Gray distanced himself from Social Darwinism. Gray is a critical link in the history of American intellectualism, and his writings that argue that religion and science are not necessarily mutually exclusive have been considered his supreme accomplishment; thereby providing a way for believers in Creationism to consider Darwin's ideas.

In 1868, Gray had a year's leave of absence and visited Darwin in England, the first time they had met since they started their correspondence. Darwin had Gray in mind when he wrote, "It seems to me absurd to doubt that a man may be an ardent theist & an evolutionist." Darwin dedicated his 1877 book, The Different Forms of Flowers on Plants of the Same Species, to Gray, "as a small tribute of respect and affection". One area where Darwin and Gray disagreed was Darwin's theory of pangenesis. The Grays embarked on a study visit to Europe during 1880 and 1881, including a final visit to Darwin at his Down House home. Darwin died in 1882.

== Personal life ==
Gray became engaged to Jane Lathrop (Note: Sometimes misspelled as Lothrop.) Loring of Boston in May 1847. Two of Gray's younger brothers, George and Joseph, were students at Harvard in the late 1840s and lived with Gray. During his junior year, George caught typhoid fever in late 1847 and died on January 9, 1848, in the Loring house in Boston. This is part of the reason Gray's marriage was delayed from fall 1847 to spring 1848. Gray and Jane Loring married on May 4, 1848. Her parents were Charles Greely Loring (1794–1867), a member of the Harvard Corporation and a lawyer, and Anna Pierce (Brace) Loring. Her family was Unitarian, like most faculty and staff of Harvard at the time. Both of them kept to their separate religious denominations yet seem to have had no difficulties over it. They had no children. Jane Gray accompanied her husband on most of his expeditions. Gray was a devout Presbyterian and was a member of First Church in Cambridge, a Congregational church, where he served as a deacon. He was also an ardent empiricist in the tradition of John Locke and John Stuart Mill. When the congregation moved into its present building in 1872, at 11 Garden Street, Gray planted two Kentucky yellowwood trees, Cladrastis kentukea, in front of the church. They stood until October 2014.

== Death ==
On Monday, November 28, 1887, Gray's hand and arm became paralyzed while he was coming down the stairs for breakfast. Even though the paralysis worsened, he was able to address two letters. On Thursday he lost the ability to speak in a steady rhythm. He lay speechless and quiet for two months, and died on January 30, 1888. He was buried at Mount Auburn Cemetery. He wanted a simple gravestone, so his wife had it engraved with a cross and "Asa Gray 1810–1888". The cemetery's Asa Gray Garden, with a central fountain and numerous unusual tree varieties, is named in his honor.

== Legacy ==
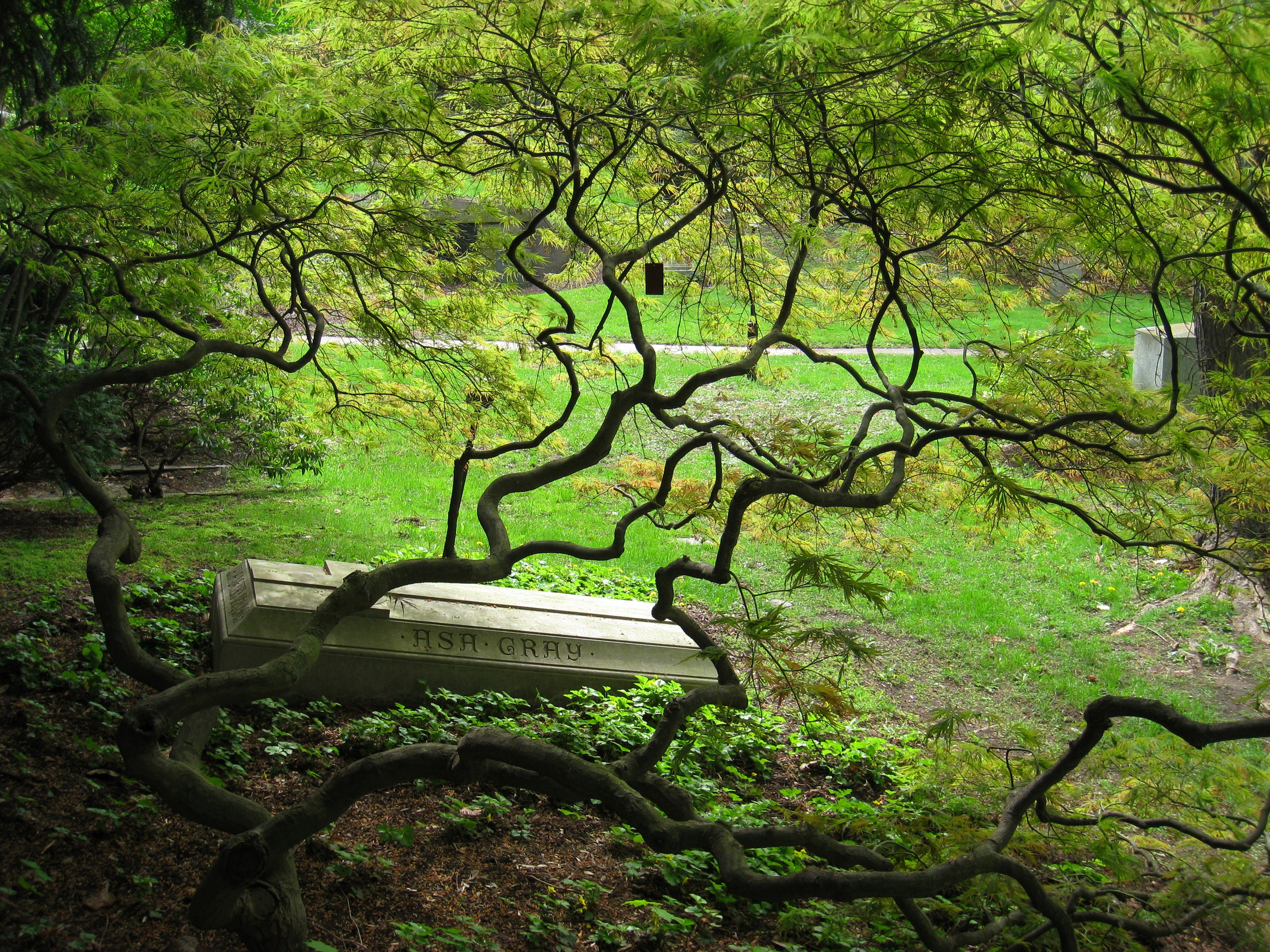
Grave in Mount Auburn Cemetery

=== Life work ===
Some of Gray's achievements were the "Asa Gray disjunction", and the vast network of scientists he built who all communicated with one another and exchanged ideas. He is considered the pre-eminent American botanist of the 19th century.

On Gray's 75th birthday, botanists led by editors of the Botanical Gazette presented Gray with a silver vase with the inscription "1810, November eighteenth, 1885. Asa Gray, in token of the universal esteem of American Botanists." An accompanying silver salver had the inscription "Bearing the greetings of one hundred and eighty botanists of North America to Asa Gray on his 75th birthday, Nov. 18, 1885."

Also received on his 75th birthday was a poem by James Russell Lowell:

Just fate, prolong his life, well spent,
Whose indefatigable hours
Have been as gayly innocent,
And fragrant as his flowers.

He was elected to honorary membership of the Manchester Literary and Philosophical Society on 19 april 1887 at the AGM.

=== Namesakes ===
- Grayanotoxin is named after him.
- William Hooker named the genus Grayia after Gray.
- The Asa Gray Award, awarded by the American Society of Plant Taxonomists, was established in 1984 to honor a living botanist for career achievements.
- Gray has two namesake buildings at Harvard University: the Asa Gray House, which is a National Historic Landmark, and the Gray Herbarium.
- A residential building is named after him on the Stony Brook University campus.
- Two mountain peaks are named after him: Gray Peak in New York and Grays Peak in Colorado. The latter is near Torreys Peak, named after his mentor and friend John Torrey.
- In 2011 the US Postal Service released an Asa Gray first-class postage stamp as part of its American Scientists series, along with Melvin Calvin, Maria Goeppert-Mayer, and Severo Ochoa. This was the third volume of this series. It features Shortia galacifolia, a flowering plant that fascinated Gray.
- A street named after Asa Gray is home to the University Commons of the University of Michigan in Ann Arbor, Michigan.
- Asa Gray Park in Lake Helen, Florida, is named in his honor.

== List of selected publications ==
- Grisebach, A.; Gray, Asa; Wright, Charles (1837). A Natural System of Botany. American. doi:10.5962/bhl.title.708.
- with Torrey, John (1838–1843). A Flora of North America. Vol. I & II. New York: Wiley & Putnam. doi:10.5962/bhl.title.9466.
- with Sullivant, William Starling (1848). A Manual of the Botany of the Northern United States. Boston: James Munroe and Company. doi:10.5962/bhl.title.10392.
- with Wright, Charles (1852–1853). Plantae Wrightianae Texano – Neo-Mexicanae. Vol. 1&2. Washington, D. C.: Smithsonian Institution.
- Gray, Asa (1854). United States Exploring Expedition Botany. During the years 1838, 1839, 1840, 1841, 1842. Under the command of Charles Wilkes, U.S.N. Vol. XV. Botany. Phanerogamia, Part 1: With a Folio Atlas of One Hundred Plates. Philadelphia: C Sherman.
- First Lessons in Botany and Vegetable Physiology. New York: Ivison and Phinney. 1857.
- How Plants Grow: A Simple Introduction to Structural Botany. New York: American Book Company. 1858.
- Gray, Asa (1862). Introduction to Structural and Systematic Botany and Vegetable Physiology. New York: Phinney & Company. doi:10.5962/bhl.title.3964.
- How Plants Behave. New York: Ivison, Blakeman, Taylor & Co. 1872.
- Gray, Asa (1876). Darwiniana: Essays and Reviews Pertaining to Darwinism. New York: Appleton & Company. p. 21. doi:10.5962/bhl.title.19483. LCCN 04005631. OCLC 774014.
- Gray, Asa (1878–1897). Synoptical Flora of North America. New York: American Book Company. doi:10.5962/bhl.title.10847.
- Gray, Asa (1879). Gray's Botanical Text-book. Vol. I & II. New York: American Book Company. doi:10.5962/bhl.title.1355.
- Natural Science and Religion, 2 lectures delivered to the Theological School of Yale College. New York: Scribner and Sons. 1880.
- with Hooker, Joseph Dalton (1880). "The Vegetation of the Rocky Mountain Region, and A Comparison With That of Other Parts of the World". Bulletin of the United States Geological and Geographical Survey of the Territories. VI (1). Washington, DC: United States Government Printing Office: 1–77.
- Gray, Asa (1887). Gray's School and Field Book of Botany. New York: American Book Company. doi:10.5962/bhl.title.55588.
- Gray, Asa (1888). Synoptical Flora of North America: The Gamopetalae. Vol. I, pt. II, and II, pt. I (2 ed.). Washington, DC: Smithsonian Institution. doi:10.5962/bhl.title.1520.
- Gray, Asa (May 4, 1852). "Monthly Meeting". Proceedings of the American Academy of Arts and Sciences. 2: 323–325.(Original descriptions of Agatea, Isodendrion, Richella)

== Sources ==
- Alexander, Denis R.; Numbers, Ronald L. (2010). Biology and Ideology from Descartes to Dawkins. Chicago: University of Chicago Press. ISBN 978-0-226-60840-2.
- Boufford, D. E.; Spongberg, S. A. (1983). "Eastern Asian – Eastern North American Phytogeographical Relationships – A History From The Time of Linnaeus To The Twentieth Century". Annals of the Missouri Botanical Garden. 70 (3): 423. Bibcode:1983AnMBG..70..423B. doi:10.2307/2992081. JSTOR 2992081.
- Bowler, Peter J. (2003). Evolution:The History of an Idea. Oakland, CA: University of California Press. ISBN 0-520-23693-9.
- Browne, Janet (2010). "Asa Gray and Charles Darwin: Corresponding Naturalists" (PDF). Harvard Papers in Botany. 15 (2): 209–220. doi:10.3100/025.015.0204. S2CID 162665948.
- Crafts, Edward Clayton; Ellison, Lincoln (1938). A Selected Bibliography on Management of Western Ranges, Livestock, and Wildlife. United States Department of Agriculture.
- Darwin, Charles (April 25, 1855). "Letter 1674, Darwin Correspondence Project". Letter to Asa Gray.
- Darwin, Charles (January 22, 1860). "Letter 2814, Darwin Correspondence Project". Letter to Asa Gray.
- Darwin, Charles (January 21, 1878). "Letter 11330, Darwin Correspondence Project". Letter to Asa Gray.
- Darwin, Charles (May 7, 1879). "Letter 12041, Darwin Correspondence Project". Letter to John Fordyce.
- Darwin, Charles (January 29, 1881). "Letter 13031, Darwin Correspondence Project". Letter to Asa Gray.
- Darwin, Charles (1888). Darwin, Francis (ed.). The Life and Letters of Charles Darwin. London: John Murray, Albemarle Street. p. 60.
- Deane, Walter (1888). "Asa Gray". Bulletin of the Torrey Botanical Club. XV (3): 59–72. doi:10.2307/2476862. JSTOR 2476862. Archived from the original on November 10, 2014.
- Donnelly, Walter A. (1958). The University of Michigan: An Encyclopedic Survey, Pt 8. Ann Arbor, MI: University of Michigan Press.
- Dupree, A. Hunter (1988). Asa Gray, American Botanist, Friend of Darwin. Baltimore, MD: Johns Hopkins University Press. ISBN 978-0-8018-3741-8.
- Farlow, W. G. "Memoir of Asa Gray 1810–1888" (PDF). National Academy of Sciences.
- Gannett, Henry (1905). The Origin of Certain Place Names in the United States. Vol. 258 (2 ed.). Washington, DC: United States Geological Survey.
- Gray, Asa (1876). Darwiniana: Essays and Reviews Pertaining to Darwinism. New York: Appleton & Company. p. 21. doi:10.5962/bhl.title.19483. LCCN 04005631. OCLC 774014. Not to be confused with Darwiniana: Essays, by Thomas Henry Huxley (1898).
- Gray, Jane Loring (1894). Letters of Asa Gray. New York: Houghton, Mifflin, and Co. p. 13.
- Herwick III, Edgar B. (October 16, 2014). "142-Year-Old Trees Cut Down In Cambridge". WGBH News.
- Holmgren, Noel H. (2003). "Grayia". In Flora of North America Editorial Committee (ed.). Flora of North America North of Mexico (FNA). Vol. 4. New York and Oxford: Oxford University Press – via eFloras.org, Missouri Botanical Garden, St. Louis, Missouri and Harvard University Herbaria, Cambridge, Massachusetts.
- Jenkins, Charles F. (1942). "Asa Gray and his Quest for Shortia galacifolia". Arnoldia. 2 (3 & 4): 13–28. doi:10.5962/p.249222. JSTOR 42953488.
- Love, Rhoda M. (Fall 1998). "Wilhelm Nikolaus Suksdorf (1850–1932) Pioneer Botanist of the Pacific Northwest" (PDF). Pacific Northwest Quarterly. Archived from the original (PDF) on March 4, 2016.
- Linden, Blanche M. G. (2007). Silent City on a Hill: Picturesque Landscapes of Memory and Boston's Mount Auburn Cemetery. Amherst, MA: University of Massachusetts Press. ISBN 978-1-55849-571-5.
- Matthews, Brander (January 1904). "Concerning the Quatrain". The Lamp. 27: 589.
- Miles, Sara Joan (September 2001). "Charles Darwin and Asa Gray Discuss Teleology and Design". PSCF (American Scientific Affiliation). 53.
- Moore, Randy (2002). Evolution in the Courtroom: A Reference Guide. Santa Barbara, CA: ABC-CLIO. ISBN 1-57607-421-8.
- Moore, G.; Macklin, J.; DeCesare, L. (2010). "A Brief History of Asa Gray's Manual of Botany". Harvard Papers in Botany. 15 (2): 277–286. doi:10.3100/025.015.0207. S2CID 162816027.
- Pitcher, Zina (1856). Laws and Regulations of the American Medical Association, With a Sketch of Detroit, and a Brief History of the University of Michigan, and of the Development of the Resources of the State. Detroit: R. F. Johnstone & Company.
- Senning, Alexander (2007). Elsevier's Dictionary of Chemoetymology. Amsterdam: Elsevier. ISBN 978-0-444-52239-9.
- Smith, Daniel A. (October 5, 2014). "God's Beloved Yellowwoods". First Church in Cambridge. Archived from the original on December 24, 2015.
- Torrey, Eliza Shaw (1988). "On the Trail of John Torrey, #10". Bulletin of the Torrey Botanical Club. 15 (3): 221–228. doi:10.2307/2995959. JSTOR 2995959.
- Wen, Jun (1999). "Evolution of Eastern Asian and Eastern North American Disjunct Distributions in Flowering Plants". Annual Review of Ecology and Systematics. 30 (1): 421–455. Bibcode:1999AnRES..30..421W. doi:10.1146/annurev.ecolsys.30.1.421. JSTOR 221691.
- Zeller, Suzanne (1994). "Penhallow, David Pearce". Dictionary of Canadian Biography.
- "Alfred Russel Wallace (1823–1913)". The Linnean Society of London. Archived from the original on January 2, 2015.
- "Asa Gray". Darwin Correspondence Project. June 5, 2015.
- "Asa Gray". Encyclopædia Britannica. September 30, 2013. 242613.
- "Asa Gray". Litchfield Historical Society.
- "Asa Gray". University of Michigan. Archived from the original on June 18, 2021.
- "Asa Gray Award". American Society of Plant Taxonomists. February 18, 2012. Archived from the original on December 31, 2014.
- "Asa Gray House". National Historic Landmark Summary listing. National Park Service. April 16, 2003. Archived from the original on October 9, 2012.
- "Biographies of Scientists and Explorers". Southwest Colorado Wildflowers.
- "Gray Gets Stamp of Approval". Harvard Gazette. June 30, 2011.
- "Gray Herbarium (GH)". Harvard University Herbaria & Libraries.
- "Gray's Peak". Harvard University Herbaria. 2010. Archived from the original on January 6, 2015.
- "Housing – Independent, Assisted Living, Alzheimer's". University of Michigan Geriatrics Center and Institute of Gerontology. Archived from the original on January 4, 2015.
- "Liberty Hyde Bailey Jr. (1858–1954) Papers". Harvard University Herbaria. Archived from the original on April 2, 2015.
- "Lake Helen Public Information City Guide". City of Lake Helen, Florida. Archived from the original on February 13, 2015.
- "Mendelsohn Quad". Stony Brook University. Archived from the original on January 2, 2015.
