= Arti K. Rai =

American legal academic

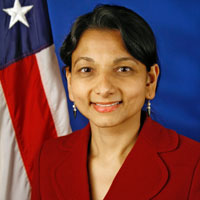
- Rai in 2009
- Occupations: Legal scholar, professor
- Employer: Duke University School of Law
- Title: Elvin R. Latty Professor of Law
- Awards: American Law Institute (elected member)

Academic background
- Education: Harvard College (A.B.); Harvard Law School (J.D.)

Academic work
- Discipline: Law
- Sub-discipline: Intellectual property law, patent law
- Institutions: Duke University School of Law
- Notable works: Valuing Health Care: Improving Productivity and Quality (2012); Critical Concepts in Intellectual Property Law: Biotechnology (2011); Law and the Mental Health System (2008)

Arti K. Rai is an American lawyer, law professor and former public official. She is currently the Elvin R. Latty Professor of Law at Duke Law School. She was previously a member of the presidential transition of Barack Obama and subsequently served in the Department of Commerce as a Patent Office advisor. During the early 2000s, Rai was one of the leading academic advocates of patent reform, particularly the creation of a robust post-grant opposition system for U.S. patents.

== Education and early career ==
Rai received an A.B. in biochemistry and history from Harvard College in 1987 and spent a year as a student at Harvard Medical School. She graduated in 1991 from Harvard Law School, where her team won top honors at the prestigious Ames Moot Court Competition. Her classmates in law school included future president Barack Obama and future Supreme Court justice Neil Gorsuch. After graduation, Rai clerked for Judge Marilyn Hall Patel of the United States District Court for the Northern District of California. Following private practice at the firm of Jenner & Block and service as the trial attorney in the Civil Division of the U.S. Department of Justice, she entered academia.

== Public service ==
As a member of the Obama-Biden transition, Rai was part of the team reviewing and science and technology issues, particularly in the United States Patent and Trademark Office. After the confirmation of David Kappos as Under Secretary of Commerce for Intellectual Property and Director of the USPTO, Rai served as the agency's chief policy advisor until 2010.

She has served as a member of the National Advisory Council for Human Genome Research and a public member of the Administrative Conference of the United States, and is an elected member of the American Law Institute.

== Patent reform ==
Rai argued for the creation of post-grant opposition system for U.S. patents, with greater attention to principles of administrative law than the patent system has historically shown. In 2011, Congress enacted much of the post-grant opposition reform agenda into the Leahy-Smith America Invents Act.

In the mid-2000s, Rai was also one of the leading proponents of a set of controversial Patent Office regulations that would have constrained the use of continuation practice in U.S. patent examination. The regulations were challenged as being outside the legal authority of the Patent Office, and were ultimately withdrawn while the case appeal was pending.

== Books ==
- Valuing Health Care: Improving Productivity and Quality 2012 (with the Kauffman Task Force on Cost-Effective Health Care Innovation)
- Critical Concepts in Intellectual Property Law: Biotechnology (editor) Cheltenham, UK: Edward Elgar, 2011.
- Law and the Mental Health System (with Ralph Reisner & Chris Slobogin) 5th ed. Eagan, MN: West Group, 2008.
