= Institute of Education of the Republic of Azerbaijan =

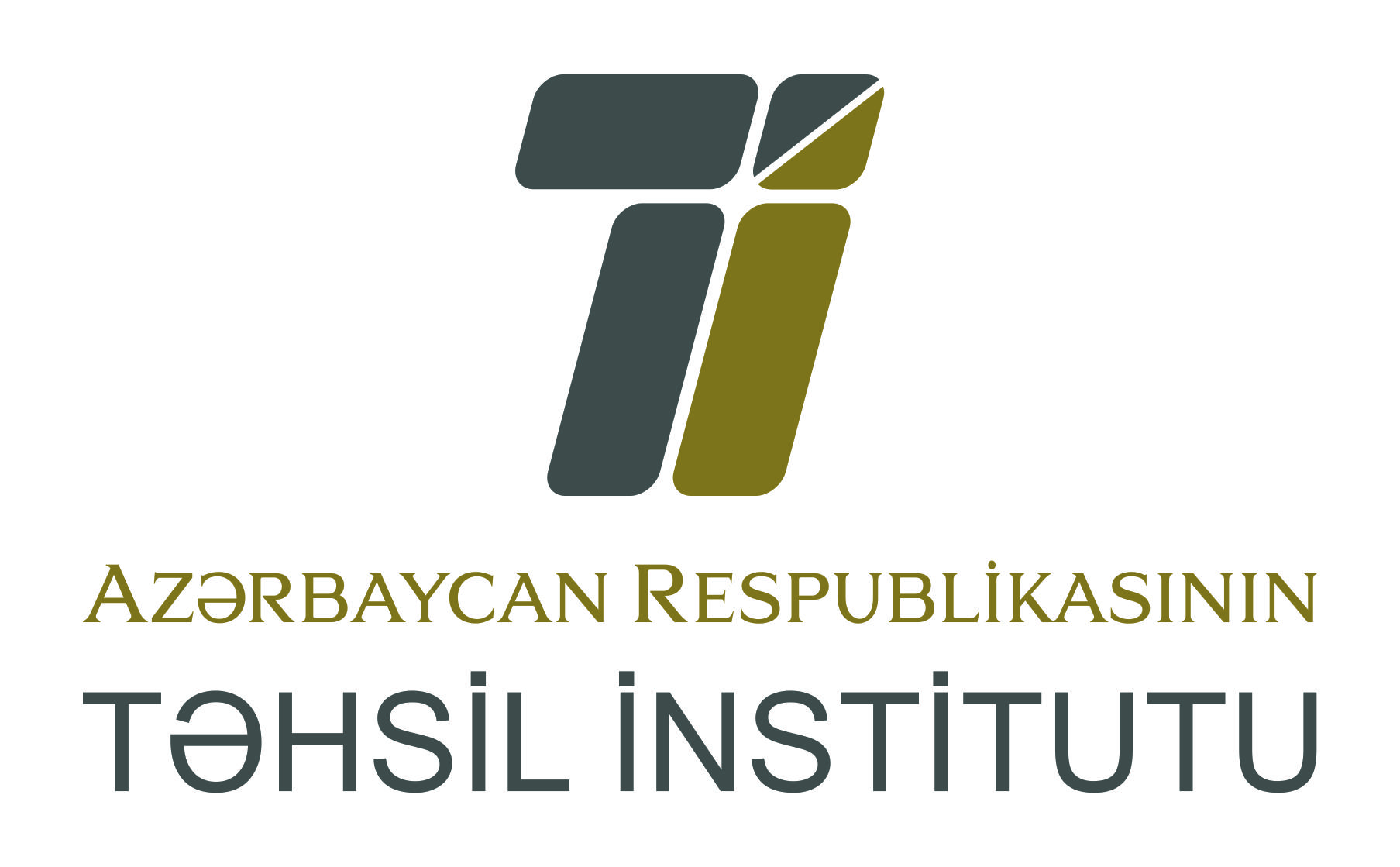

Institute of Education of the Republic of Azerbaijan (Azerbaijani: Azərbaycan Respublikasının Təhsil İnstitutu (ARTİ)) is an organization subordinate to Ministry of Education of Azerbaijan.

== History ==
The first scientific research institute in the field of education of the Azerbaijan SSR - Azerbaijan Scientific Research Institute of Pedology was established on July 1, 1931, on the basis of Order No. 30 of Department of Public Education of Baku dated June 30, 1930, and Order No. 87 of People's Commissariat of Education dated June 29, 1931. The name of the institute and the direction of its activities have changed many times:

- From July 1931 to October 1932 – Azerbaijan Scientific Research Institute of Pedology;
- From October 1932 to October 1934 – Azerbaijan Institute of Pedology and Pedagogy;
- From October 1934 to December 1934 – Azerbaijan State Research Pedagogical Institute;
- From December 1934 to August 1936 – Azerbaijan Institute of Pedology and Pedagogy;
- From August 1936 to December 1937 – Azerbaijan State Scientific Research Pedagogical Institute named after V. I. Lenin;
- From January 1938 to June 1938 – Azerbaijan Scientific Research Pedagogical Institute;
- From June 1938 to January 1946 – Azerbaijan State Scientific Research Institute of Schools of Ministry of Education of Azerbaijan SSR;
- From January 1946 to January 1951 – Azerbaijan Scientific Research Pedagogical Institute;
- From January 1951 to March 1977 – Azerbaijan State Research Pedagogical Institute;
- From March 1977 to June 2000 – Azerbaijan Research Institute of Pedagogical Sciences.

By Decree No. 349 of President of Azerbaijan, Heydar Aliyev, dated June 13, 2000, Institute of Educational Problems of Azerbaijan was established based on the Scientific and Methodological Center and the Research Institute of Pedagogical Sciences under the Ministry of Education of Azerbaijan.

By Decree No. 1107 of President of Azerbaijan, Ilham Aliyev, dated November 14, 2016, the Institute of Education Problems of Azerbaijan was renamed Institute of Education of Azerbaijan.

According to Decree of Prime Minister Ali Asadov, in 2019, the Institute for Professional Development of Educational Workers, the Center for Work with Gifted Children and the Republican Scientific and Pedagogical Library were merged with the Institute of Education of Azerbaijan.

Since January 2021, Rufat Azizov is the Chairman of the institution.

== Goals and objectives ==
The main goal of the Institute of Education is to implement the state policy in the field of education: to conduct pedagogical, psychological, social, economic, fundamental and applied research; to develop content for all levels of education; to establish and implement innovations.

The activities of the Institute include:

- conducting research to improve quality indicators in educational institutions, including expanding learning opportunities and creating equal opportunities for students;
- training of competent staff;
- development of educational assessment standards;
- organization of psychological services in various educational institutions;
- preparation of electronic content, etc.

== See also ==
Ministry of education of Azerbaijan
