= Arti Dhand =

- Education: Ph.D. (McGill), M.A. (Calgary), B.A. (Calgary)
- Occupations: Associate Professor, Department for the Study of Religion, University of Toronto, Ontario, Canada
- Website: religion.utoronto.ca/people/faculty/arti-dhand/

Arti Dhand is an associate professor at the University of Toronto, Department for the Study of Religion. She specialises in the Mahabharata and the Ramayana Hindu epics, Hindu ethics, gender issues in Hinduism, and religion and sexuality.

== Career ==
She has authored several publications including Woman as Fire, Woman as Sage: Sexual Ideology in the Mahabharata published in 2008 and numerous articles on topics such as "Engendering Brahmanirvanam in the Mahabharata: A Conversation between Suka and Sulabha," "Hinduism and Pedagogy: Teaching Hinduism to Hindus in the Canadian Diaspora," and "The Subversive Nature of Dharma in the Mahabharata: A Tale of Women, Smelly Ascetics, and God."

She was a key speaker at the 2005 conference of the London School of Oriental and African Studies. The SOAS also commends her scholarly works in her chosen field of research.

== Education ==
Arti Dhand has a B.A. and M.A. from the University of Calgary, and a Ph.D. from McGill University.

== Principal publications ==
- 2005 "Hinduism and Pedagogy: Teaching Hinduism to Hindus in the Canadian Diaspora". In Method and Theory in the Study of Religion. 72/2. 22pp.
- 2005 Women and Sexual Ideology in the Mahabharata. Book manuscript under review.
- 2003 "The Subversive Nature of Dharma in the Mahabharata: A Tale of Women, Smelly Ascetics, and God" Journal of the American Academy of Religion.
- 2002 "The Dharma of Ethics, the Ethics of Dharma: Quizzing the Ideals of Hinduism". Journal of Religious Ethics. Fall 2002. 30.3: 347-372.
- 1995 "Karpu: The Ideal of Feminine Chastity in the Cilappatikaram".
- 1997 "Post-colonial Critique of Indology, and its Implications for the Study of Hindu Women".
