= Tijs Goldschmidt =

Dutch writer and biologist

Tijs Goldschmidt Paul-Tijs Goldschmidt
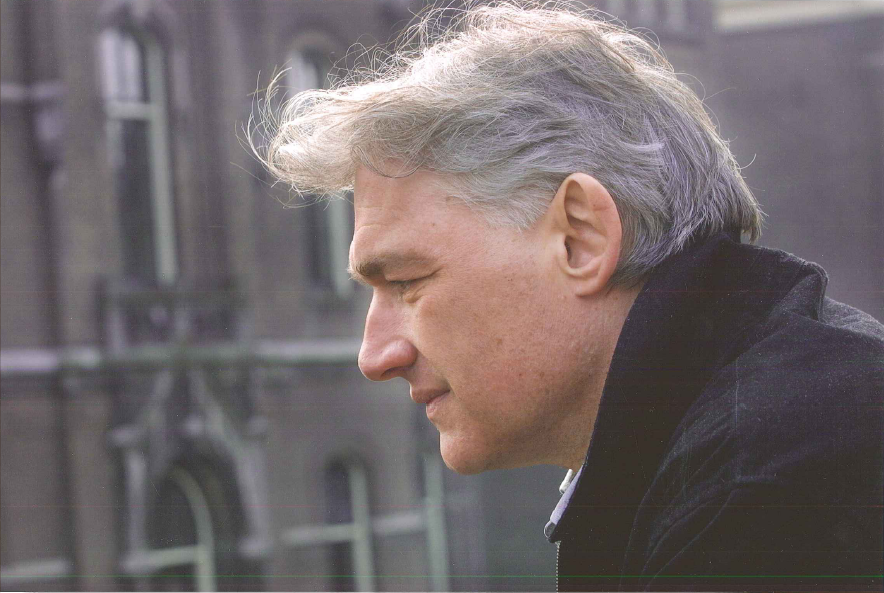
- Born: 30 January 1953 (age 73); Amsterdam, Netherlands

Paul-Tijs (Tijs) Goldschmidt (born 30 January 1953) is a Dutch writer and evolutionary biologist. Since 1 March 2012, Goldschmidt is writer in residence of the Artis Bibliotheek, which is part of the University of Amsterdam (UvA).

Goldschmidt lived in Tanzania from 1981 to 1986, where he studied cichlids in Lake Victoria as a researcher from Leiden University. He wrote a dissertation on this and published a book called Darwin's Dreampond: Drama on Lake Victoria (original Dutch title: Darwins hofvijver) in which he intertwines scientific and personal experiences. This book has been translated into, amongst other languages, English, French, German, and Japanese.

Since 2009, Tijs Goldschmidt is advisor at the Rijksakademie van beeldende kunsten in Amsterdam.
