= Aarti Gupta (model) =

Indian model

- Beauty pageant titleholder
- Title: Miss Teen India International 2014
- Years active: 2014-present
- Major competition: Miss Teen International

Aarti Gupta, known also as Aarti S. Gupta, is a model and titleholder of Miss Teen India International 2014.

== Biography ==
Aarti Gupta was born in the United States. Her family can be traced back to Kanpur, Uttar Pradesh in India, Gupta represented India on an international level at Miss Teen International in 2014.
