= Arathi =

Christian religious movement

The Arathi, a term meaning "prophets", are a Christian religious movement founded in 1926 in Kenya. Along with the African Orthodox Church, Arathi was founded by the Agikuyu in the wake of Kenya's civil unrest during the 1920. Joseph Ng'ang'a and Musa Thuo are among the sect's most notable prophets.

Arathi was outlawed in 1934, when colonial officials prohibited Arathi meetings.

Baptism has remained a central part of the Arathi tradition since its founding, and is still practiced today. It is viewed as a symbol of the beginning of a new life, and followers receive a new name after their baptism.
