= Gerardus Frederik Westerman =

Dutch publisher, bird fancier, and philanthropist

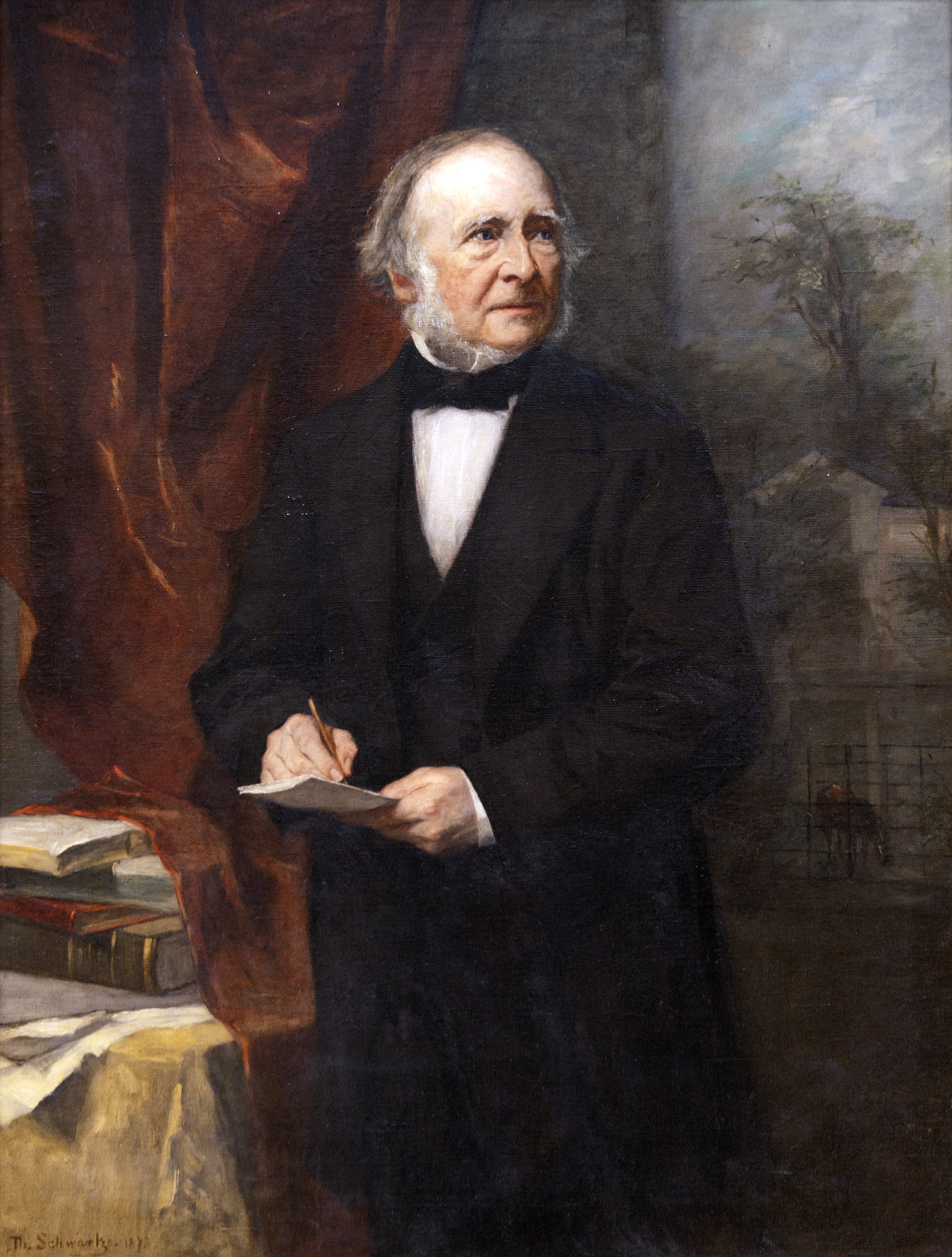
Portrait by Thérése Schwartze, 1878

Gerardus Frederik Westerman (8 December 1807 – 9 May 1890) was a Dutch publisher, bird fancier, and philanthropist. He was one of the three founders of the Royal Zoological Society Natura Artis Magistra ("Artis") and became the first director of the Amsterdam zoo in 1879. He received an honorary doctorate for his work on birds and several species were named after him.

== Life and work ==
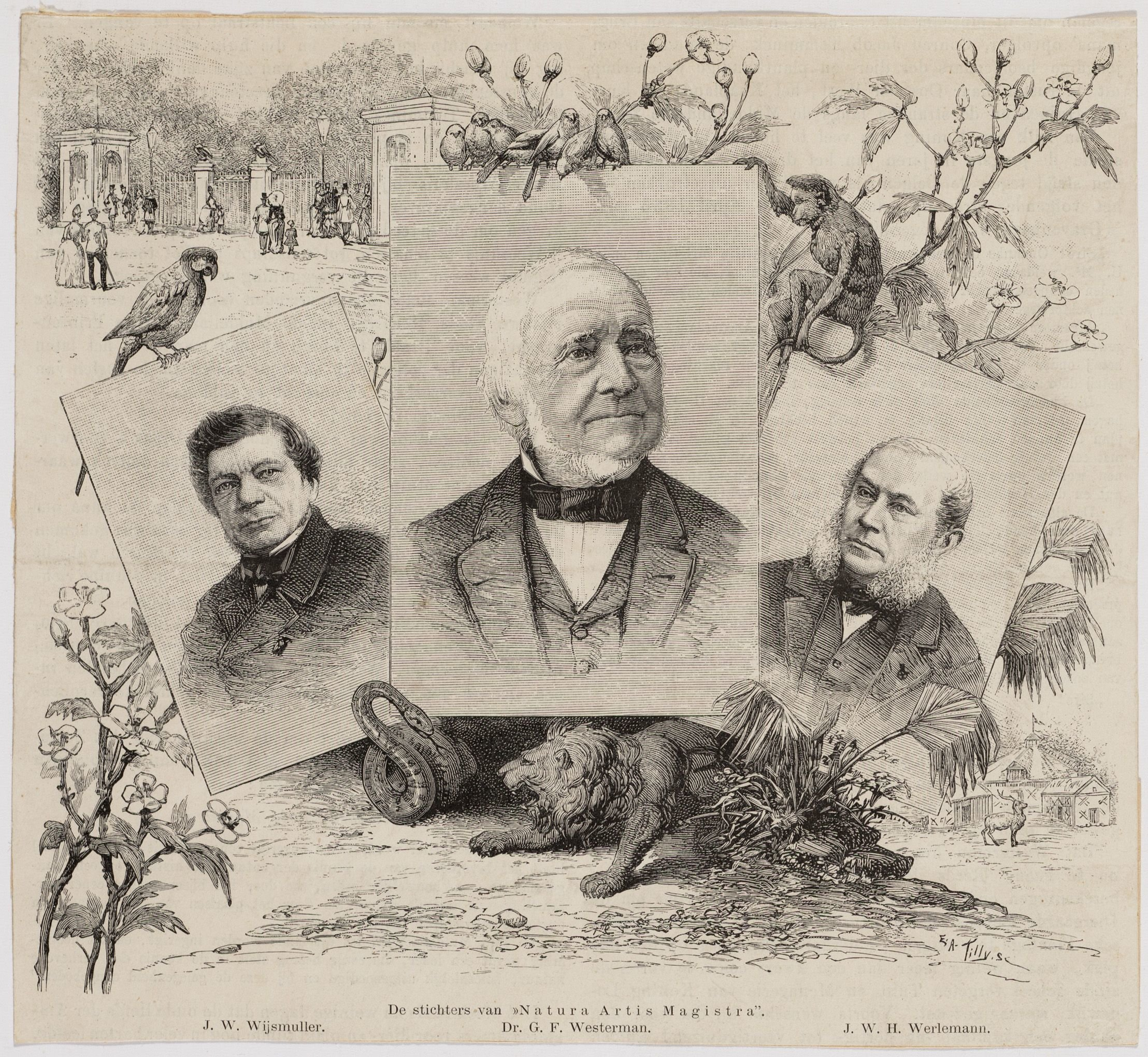
The founders of Artis

Westerman was born in Rotterdam to Marten (1775-1852), from a wealthy German-origin family of publishers and booksellers, and Anna Rudolphina Prince (1774-1860). His father served as director of the Amsterdam city theatre. Westerman worked as a bookseller and publisher with his father in M. Westerman and Son located on Kalverstraat. Having seen London zoo, Westerman sought to establish a similar enterprise in Amsterdam in 1836 but this was denied after the city administration opposed a proposal made to King Willem I. In 1839 he became a co-founder of the Society known as "Artis". The other founders were commission agent J. W. H. Werlemann and watchmaker J. Wijsmullers. This elite society bought a piece of land cooperatively for the zoo and library which became the home of Westerman's private library in 1856 and he became its second director in 1843. The society had 400 subscribers in its first week and in 1852 there were 2500 subscribers. The society was largely meant for use by the members. The library building was designed in Gerlof Bartholomeus Salm (1831-1897) with the lower floor serving as housing for the animals. His collection of books included such rarities as the 1485 "De Proprietatibus Rerum" by Bartholomaeus Anglicus. He also received an honorary doctorate from the University of Giessen in 1851 for his work in ornithology with hand-colored lithographs that he published in the journal that he founded in 1848, Bijdragen tot de Dierkunde. This may have been supported by Westerman's friend Theodor W. Bisschoff who was professor of anatomy and physiology. In 1860 he published a work on the turacos in collaboration with Hermann Schlegel. Schlegel had worked with the Amsterdam zoo from 1839 when he was involved in organizing the amphibian collections. Another scientist associated with the zoo was Willem Vrolik (1801-1863) who studied comparative anatomy. The land on which the library stood, the Plantage Middenlaan belonged to the society and parts of it were later leased out to the city of Amsterdam, becoming a much sought and upscale locality. The zoological gardens were established in 1840 when Artis received permits from the city administration to build a wooden shed to house animals. Westerman was made the first director of this gallery of living animals which was opened in August 1840. Westerman resigned from the family business firm in 1858. The model followed by "Artis" was so successful that artists formed a similar organization called Arti et Amicitiae in 1839.

Westerman married Maria Eleonora van der Schroeff (1812-1892) in 1833 and they had eight children. He is buried in the Nieuwe Oosterbegraafplaats in Amsterdam.

The bird species Ficedula westermanni (misspelt) named by Richard Bowdler Sharpe in 1888, the parrot Eclectus roratus westermani described by Charles Lucien Bonaparte in 1850 and the woodpecker Dendrocopos macei westermani named by Edward Blyth in 1870 commemorate Westerman who collected live birds for the zoo and also had a collection of skins. The bird subspecies Cacatua galerita eleonora was named after Westerman's wife by Otto Finsch.
