= Darwiniana =

Collection of essays by botanist Asa Gray

Darwiniana: Essays and Reviews Pertaining to Darwinism is a collection of essays by botanist Asa Gray, first published in 1876. These widely read essays both defended the theory of evolution from the standpoint of botany and sought reconciliation with theology by arguing theistic evolution — that natural selection is not inconsistent with Christianity. Gray considered natural selection to be the cause of new species, which was itself caused by some inherent power imparted in the beginning by Godhead.

== External sources ==
- Asa Gray (1876). Darwiniana; Essays and Reviews Pertaining to Darwinism
- Miles, Sara Joan (2001), "Charles Darwin and Asa Gray Discuss Teleology and Design", Perspectives on Science and Christian Faith, vol. 53, pp. 196–201
- Darwin and design: historical essay.
