= Aarti Gupta (computer scientist) =

American computer scientist

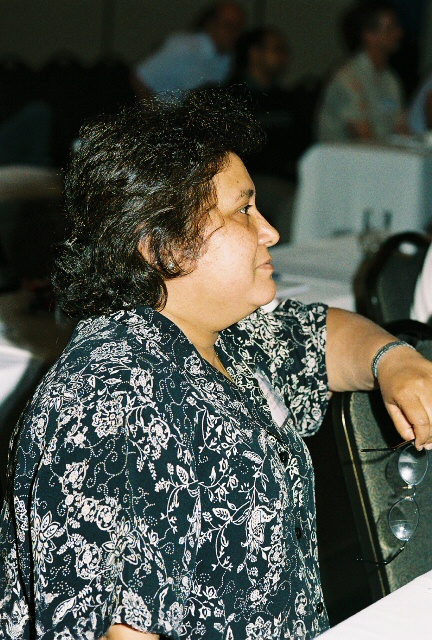
- Aarti Gupta at FLoC 2006
- Occupation: Computer scientist

Academic background
- Education: IIT Delhi; Carnegie Mellon University (Ph.D., 1994)

Aarti Gupta is a computer scientist working in formal methods, Electronic Design Automation, and programming languages. Educated in India and the US, she is currently a professor in the Department of Computer Science at Princeton University.

== Education and career ==
Aarti Gupta received her undergraduate degree from IIT Delhi, India and PhD in computer science from Carnegie Mellon University in 1994. She later worked at NEC Laboratories America developing tools for verifying correctness of large-scale industrial codebases written in C and C++ code. The efforts of she and her team won her the 2005 NEC Technology Commercialization Award. She joined the Department of Computer Science at Princeton University as a full professor in 2015. She has published extensively on subjects such as program synthesis, verification of concurrent programs, hardware, and verification of computer networks.

== Service and awards ==
- ACM Fellow, 2017: "For contributions to system analysis and verification techniques and their transfer to industrial practice"
- Member of the Steering Committee, Computer Aided Verification conference.
- Past member of Steering Committee, Formal Methods in Computer-Aided Design (FMCAD) Conference
- Member of editorial board, Formal Methods in System Design
- Member of editorial board, ACM Transactions on Design Automation of Electronic Systems
