= Wilhelm Nikolaus Suksdorf =

German-born American botanist (1850-1932)

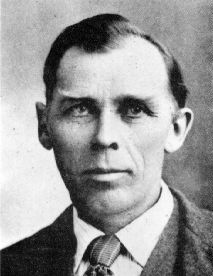
- Suksdorf, circa 1900
- Born: September 15, 1850; Dransau, Duchy of Schleswig, Denmark
- Died: October 3, 1932 (aged 82); Bingen, Washington, United States
- Scientific career
- Fields: Botany

Wilhelm Nikolaus Suksdorf (September 15, 1850 – October 3, 1932) was an American botanist who specialized in the flora of the Pacific Northwest. He was largely self-taught and is considered one of the top three self-taught botanists of his era for the Pacific Northwest, alongside Thomas Jefferson Howell and William Conklin Cusick.

== Early life ==
Suksdorf was born on September 15, 1850, in the small village of Dransau, along the eastern border of Schleswig, but it is often listed as the nearby large city of Kiel, Germany. At the time the area was part of Denmark. His parents were Detlev Suksdorf, a tenant farmer, and Louise Schröder Suksdorf, who had nine children. Two of these children were girls who died young. The seven boys all lived well into adulthood. Suksdorf was the 6th child and 2nd-youngest son.

At age eight, Suksdorf's family moved to Davenport, Iowa, where he lived until 1874. After a few years as a tenant farmer, Suksdorf's father bought 100 acres of unbroken prairie, where the family lived and farmed for 10 years.

Suksdorf often had headaches as a child and was cured by a doctor in Davenport via a treatment he never revealed because he had promised the doctor not to do so. He showed an interest in botany and flower collecting as a youth. Two of his brothers took botany classes at Iowa State University and Suksdorf watched them prepare specimens. In 1870-1871 he bought a copy of Asa Gray's Manual of Botany.

Suksdorf attended both public schools in Davenport and private German schools. He also took some classes at Griswold College and Grinnell College. About 1874 two of his elder brothers left home and found work on a ranch close to the Columbia River. The rest of the family was so impressed by their reports that the whole family moved there. From 1874 to 1876 Suksdorf began studying agriculture at the University of California, Berkeley but then left, apparently because of finances, shyness, health, and because his German was better than his English. While there he only took one botany course which included no laboratory work. He heard a guest lecture by Albert Kellogg while at Berkeley which further piqued his botanical interests. He never graduated from college but did take some coursework at Harvard University and Washington State University.

In 1876 Suksdorf moved to join the rest of his family in White Salmon, Washington, where the two elder brothers had bought 320 acres of land. This was augmented with an additional 80 acres with proceeds from the sale of the Iowa farm. The rest of his family had left Iowa during the winter of 1874–1875. About 1.5 miles from White Salmon, one of Suksdorf's brothers founded Bingen, Washington. It is named after Bingen am Rhein in Germany. Suksdorf spent practically the entire rest of his life at Bingen and never married.

After the family settled in Washington, they had numerous quarrels with a family named Jewett who lived upstream from them—especially over water rights involving a dam. Finally exasperated, Suksdorf's father sent him to dismantle the dam. Suksdorf did so despite the fact that a Jewett family member was guarding it with a shotgun. Jenny Jewett, the family matriarch, had Suksdorf arrested the next day. The following day he was ordered to be released by the judge.

== Career ==
Gray's Manual was not as helpful in Washington as it had been in Iowa as many species in Washington were still not identified, so Suksdorf began to correspond with Asa Gray at Harvard University in 1878. Gray had never been to the Pacific Northwest and relied on collectors to send him specimens for the book on the flora of North America that he was working on. Suksdorf was "shy, retiring, modest, and unsure of himself", and Gray's encouragement was a key factor in keeping him motivated in collecting and studying plants. Gray named a genus of plants after him, Suksdorfia, as well as the type species Suksdorfia violacea in 1879. Suksdorf had first collected S. violacea in 1878. Another result of this collaboration was that in 1882, Suksdorf published the first of 13 volumes of the exsiccata-like specimen series Flora of Washington.

Suksdorf continued to live in Bingen, Washington, a village his brothers founded, and remained there for 56 years. Consequently, his botanical work tended to reflect the Klickitat County, Washington-Mount Adams flora. Because of his quiet nature and the fact that he collected plants, the local native tribes befriended him, teaching him about the local flora and where rare specimens could be found. In 1880 Gray sent his colleague, Charles Christopher Parry, to Washington to work in the field with Suksdorf. Parry taught Suksdorf better methods of preserving plants. In 1881 another colleague of Gray visited Suksdorf; Cyrus Pringle. Pringle told Suksdorf that he could sell preserved plants and Suksdorf began selling his pressings, as well as bulbs and seeds, to make some money. He published his own catalog and sold to herbariums and individuals.

Suksdorf used his own names and shorthand for many local land features, making it difficult for fellow botanists to figure out which places he was talking about; until it was nearly entirely deciphered and published in 1942 in a master's thesis by William Alfred Weber, then a student at Washington State University. For example, he called Mt. Adams "Mt. Paddo", which was its original name. Suksdorf named several local plants after the mountain, such as Carex paddoensis Suksd. Suksdorf eventually collected over 150,000 specimens, including all or practically all the plants native to his home region in southwest Washington.

At the request of Fermen Layton Pickett, Suksdorf spent two winters, 1924–1925 and 1925–1926, at the Washington State University (WSU) herbarium for which Suksdorf was paid $125/month. In 1928 Harold St. John arranged for him to receive an honorary Master of Science degree from WSU. The staff expected him to steadfastly decline but they were thrilled when he heartily accepted. The ceremony was on June 9, 1928.

Suksdorf conducted his botanical work in his precious spare time as he worked full-time on the family farm, which included dozens of dairy cows. Suksdorf, Howell, and Cusick were not strong rivals as they all collected in different areas: Suksdorf in the area of Mount Adams, Howell on Sauvie Island near Portland, Oregon, and Cusick in northeastern Oregon. All three corresponded with one another, and they had to rely on academics to help identify and name specimens and at times would get frustrated with the delays; Gray generally responded more promptly than the others. Both of Suksdorf's parents died on October 22, 1885, probably of influenza. Suksdorf only collected on four more days that year and seemed to be despondent for years. Because of this despondency and his isolation from trained scientists, one of his sisters-in-law wrote to Gray on his behalf. A reply came in three weeks inviting Suksdorf to Harvard. He initially declined the offer but his family persuaded him, and about a month later Suksdorf accepted Gray's offer. He departed for Harvard by train on September 24, 1886. But circumstances, one of which was Gray's death in 1888, caused Suksdorf to leave in 1888. He was devastated by Gray's death so much that Gray's wife sent Suksdorf to a sanitarium to recover. Upon returning to work, the new Harvard herbarium director, Sereno Watson, was not kind to Suksdorf. Suksdorf returned to collecting Washington flora in Spring 1888 and publishing findings about them. He only left home for brief trips thereafter and lived with his brothers, one of which gave him four acres of land and a small house that still stands. During this time of his life he would sometimes make collecting trips into Oregon, California, other parts of Washington, and Montana. The total numbers of his documented collecting trips are: 19 both in Montana and California, 43 in Oregon, and 280 in Washington.

After Gray's death, Suksdorf developed working relationships with academics in the Pacific Northwest, including Edward Lee Greene of the University of California. Greene bought many of Suksdorf's specimens but did not agree with Gray's taxonomy nor Suksdorf's nomenclature. In an 1895 letter to Suksdorf, Greene wrote: "You are so careful an observer, and so excellent a collector, that I just wish you could be taught to study books and papers and get a little clearer botanical head. ... Gray knew nothing about the plants [in this case genus Mimulus] and so in his [Synoptical Flora] he copied Bentham's jumble in the Prodromus; and you are content with anything; ... you are not the only one who wants to swim by some authority whom nobody shall criticize ... Your Massachusetts friend's scheme is dead. There will never be another botanical pope in that seat...". Despite this letter, the two men continued their working relationship. This dispute among academics over taxonomy had started even before Gray's death. In 1892 Watson died and Benjamin Lincoln Robinson replaced him at the Harvard herbarium. Suksdorf's working relationship with the Harvard botanists steadily worsened and about 1900–1905 he had begun naming his own species. Suksdorf summed up the issue this way: "A collector sees the plants in the field and mostly many of each kind he collects, but his notes or remarks are seldom considered of importance. That was so, at least in the past. But I knew one botanist who was different; that was Dr. Gray. To him the collector was a helper, not merely a collector."

Suksdorf was invited to join both the California and Washington Academies of Science but he turned them both down. Suksdorf felt limited when using English, so most of his published writings from 1897 to 1923 appeared in German and Austrian journals. Only one American journal agreed to publish his work in German: the West American Scientist, which published six of his works in German between 1901 and 1906. He was often chastised for writing in German but persisted in doing so, only publishing a few shorter articles in English. Suksdorf had many conflicts with fellow botanists over the "International Rule", so in the 1920s he founded his own journal, Werdenda, which was published four times between 1923 and 1932. Because of anti-German sentiment during World War I, his plant sales suffered.

== Later life ==
Suksdorf's last collection in the field was in July 1929, near Bingen, as his health began to decline. Soon thereafter he wrote a will leaving his personal herbarium to WSU. He died under poorly understood circumstances near railroad tracks near his home on Monday, October 3, 1932. He had gone to ride the train from Bingen to Portland, set the signal, apparently walked onto the track, but the train did not stop and knocked him against the station wall. A non-religious ceremony was held and his remains were cremated. What was done with the cremains is unknown. By the time of his death he was a world-known plant collector noted for exquisitely prepared specimens, but this was little known in Bingen at the time. Several laudatory eulogies were published. However, Marcus E. Jones published a negative one. One of Suksdorf's brothers, Theodor, tried to sell his books and herbarium to raise funds for medical and funeral expenses, totaling $1,142.27. Theodor and Pickett both hired lawyers since Suksdorf's will had left the herbarium to Washington State University. Finally, in April 1933, Pickett offered $200 of his own money and Theodor accepted.

== Legacy ==
There are still over 30,000 specimen sheets in Suksdorf's part of the WSU collection. Including those specimens, there are about 150,000 Suksdorf-prepared specimens around the world. This includes 374 previously unknown species. One genus and about 70 plants are named after him. In 1910, the International Botanical Congress, meeting in Brussels, made Suksdorfia a conserved name. An area near Bingen that Suksdorf called "Woden Vale" is now protected land and the local chapter of the Washington Native Plant Society is called "Suksdorfia". Suksdorf Ridge on his beloved Mount Adams was named after him in 1958. In addition to Suksdorfia and Suksdorfia violacea, Suksdorfia ranunculifolia, Crataegus suksdorfii, and Erythranthe suksdorfii are also named after Suksdorf.

== Bibliography ==
- Brunsfeld, Steven J.; Johnson, Frederic D. (1990). "Cytological, Morphological, Ecological, and Phenological Support for Specific Status of Crataegus suksdorfii (Rosaceae)". Madroño. 37 (4): 274–282. JSTOR 41424822.
- Campbell, Mary Jane (October 30, 2014). "Naturalist Weber Honored for Lifetime Achievement". University of Colorado. Archived from the original on February 1, 2015.
- Hardin, Don (October 16, 2013). "Who Was Wilhelm Suksdorf?". Washington Native Plant Society.
- Jones, George Neville (April 1933). "Wilhelm N. Suksdorf". Washington Historical Quarterly. 24 (2).
- Love, Rhoda M. (Fall 1998). "Wilhelm Nikolaus Suksdorf (1850-1932) Pioneer Botanist of the Pacific Northwest" (PDF). Pacific Northwest Quarterly.
- Majors, Harry M. (1975). Exploring Washington. Van Winkle Publishing. ISBN 978-0-918664-00-6.
- Nijhuis, Michelle (December 4, 2013). "The Botanist Nobody Knew". The Last Word On Nothing.
- "Guide to the Wilhelm Nikolaus Suksdorf Papers 1867-1935". Washington State University Library.
- "History of the Herbarium". Washington State University Herbarium.
- "Naming of Suksdorf Ridge". Research Studies of the State College of Washington. 26 (1). March 1958.
