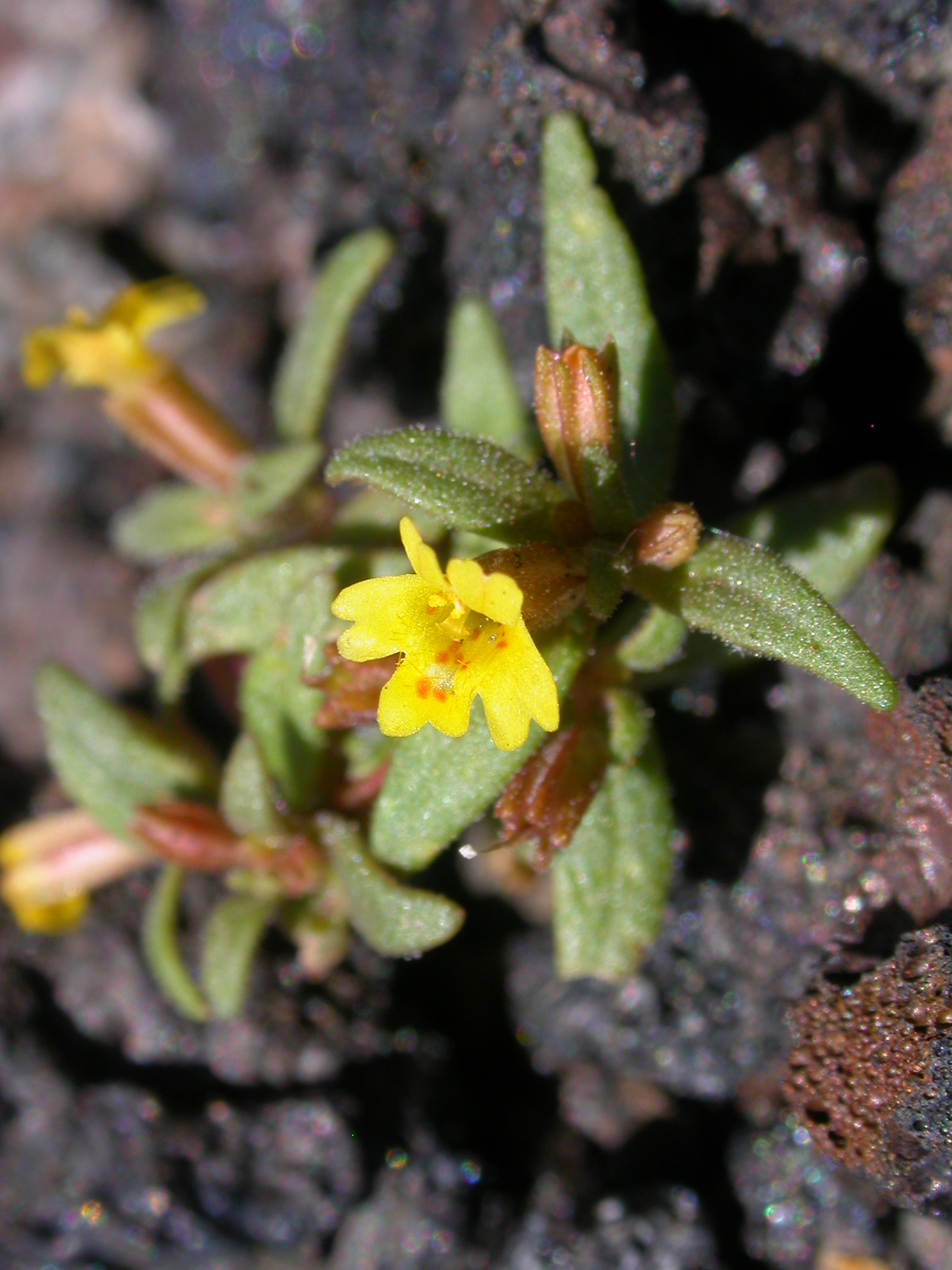

Conservation status
- Apparently Secure (NatureServe)

Scientific classification
- Kingdom: Plantae
- Clade: Embryophytes
- Clade: Tracheophytes
- Clade: Angiosperms
- Clade: Eudicots
- Clade: Asterids
- Order: Lamiales
- Family: Phrymaceae
- Genus: Erythranthe
- Species: E. suksdorfii

Binomial name
- Erythranthe suksdorfii (A.Gray) N.S.Fraga

Synonyms
- Mimulus suksdorfii A.Gray

= Erythranthe suksdorfii =

Plant species in the lopseed family

Erythranthe suksdorfii, with the common names Suksdorf's monkeyflower and miniature monkeyflower, is an annual flowering plant in the family Phrymaceae (Lopseed). It was formerly known as Mimulus suksdorfii. A specimen collected in Washington state in 1885 by the self-taught immigrant botanist Wilhelm Nikolaus Suksdorf was identified as a new species by Asa Gray in 1886, who named it in Suksdorf's honor. It was moved to the genus Erythranthe in 2012 by Naomi Fraga. It can easily be misidentified with Erythranthe breviflora, which generally has elliptic leaves rather than the linear or oblong leaves found in E. suksdorfii.

== Distribution and habitat ==
E. suksdorfii is native to Washington, Oregon, California, Idaho, Montana, Wyoming, Colorado, Nevada, Utah, Arizona, and New Mexico. The plant prefers valleys and foothills in mountainous areas at elevations of 130–2,160 meters (430–7,090 ft). It grows well in wetland-riparian areas that are moist in springtime and forests with Yellow Pine, Red Fir, and/or Lodgepole Pine in subalpine regions. Soils with good drainage are preferred. Its range has been severely impacted by human activity, resulting in having the status of "sensitive" from the Bureau of Land Management and United States Forest Service.

== Description ==
E. suksdorfii is a dicot herb. The petals are yellow and have red spots that appear from the throat to the lower corolla lobe, which is only 4–6.5 millimeters (0.16–0.26 in) long. It flowers from mid-April to July, depending upon locality. The calyx is mildly hairy. The leaves are opposite, slender, tapered, and hairy and generally sessile. The plant grows to a height of 3–10 centimeters (1.2–3.9 in).
