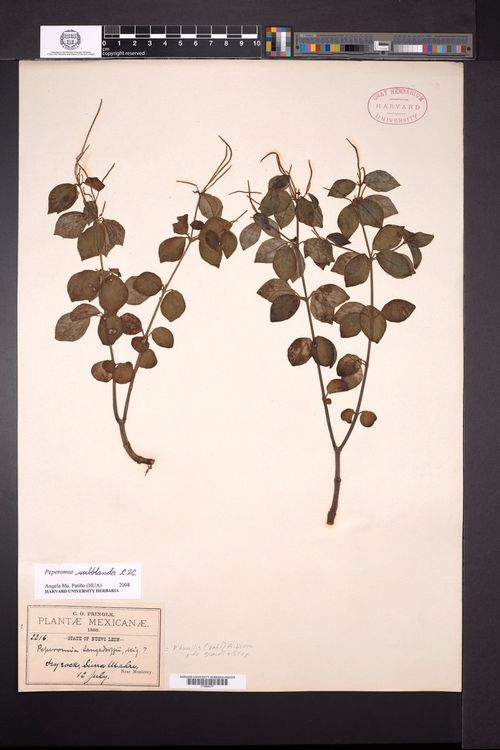

Scientific classification
- Kingdom: Plantae
- Clade: Tracheophytes
- Clade: Angiosperms
- Clade: Magnoliids
- Order: Piperales
- Family: Piperaceae
- Genus: Peperomia
- Species: P. subblanda

Binomial name
- Peperomia subblanda C. DC.

= Peperomia subblanda =

Species of Peperomia

Peperomia subblanda is a species of epiphyte in the genus Peperomia that is native to Mexico and Bolivia. It grows on wet tropical biomes. Its conservation status is Threatened.

== Description ==
The type specimen were collected in San Luis Potosí, Mexico.

Peperomia subblanda has a pilose stem, rooting below, erect and branched above, with the erect portion including the terminal spikes 25 cm long, 2 mm thick in the middle part; branchlets rather long-pilose. The leaves are ternate or quaternate with very short petioles up to 3 mm long, densely pilose; the blade is ovate-elliptic, acute at the base, attenuate above and somewhat obtuse at the apex, thinly membranaceous when dry, 5-nerved, pilose above especially on the nerves, pilose beneath throughout, ciliate on the margin; the upper leaves 2.5–4 cm long and 1.8–2.5 cm wide. The peduncles are axillary and terminal, pilose, up to 11 mm long, much exceeding the petioles. The spikes are slightly longer than the leaf blade, up to 5 cm long and 1 mm thick, slender and densely flowered. The bract is rounded, shortly pedicellate just above the middle. The filaments are short, anthers rounded. The ovary is emergent, ovate, bearing a stigma below the oblique acute apex; the stigma is papillosulose.

== Taxonomy and naming ==
It was described in 1920 by Casimir de Candolle in the Annuaire du Conservatoire et du Jardin botaniques de Genève, from specimens collected by Cyrus Pringle in Mexico and by Britton & Rusby in Bolivia. The epithet subblanda refers to its similarity to Peperomia blanda, with which it is compared.

== Distribution and habitat ==
It is native to Mexico and Bolivia. It grows as a terrestrial or epiphyte and is a herb. It grows on wet tropical biomes.

== Conservation ==
This species is assessed as Threatened, in a preliminary report.
