= Carex pringlei =

Scientific classification
- Kingdom: Plantae
- Clade: Tracheophytes
- Clade: Angiosperms
- Clade: Monocots
- Clade: Commelinids
- Order: Poales
- Family: Cyperaceae
- Genus: Carex
- Species: C. pringlei

Binomial name
- Carex pringlei L.H.Bailey

Species of plant

Carex pringlei is a tussock-forming species of perennial sedge in the family Cyperaceae. It is native to north eastern parts of Mexico.

The species was first formally described by the botanist Liberty Hyde Bailey in 1892 as a part of the Botanical Gazette. The type specimen was collected by Cyrus Pringle in 1891 near San Luis Potosí.

== See also ==
- List of Carex species
