= Bernabé Cobo =

Spanish Jesuit missionary and writer

Bernabé Cobo (born at Lopera in Spain, 1582; died at Lima, Peru, 9 October 1657) was a Spanish Jesuit missionary and writer. He played a part in the early history of quinine by his description of cinchona bark; he brought some to Europe on a visit in 1632.

He was a "most thorough" student of nature and man. His long residence in Spanish America (61 years), his position as a priest and, several times, as a missionary, gave him unusual opportunities for obtaining reliable information.

== Life ==
Cobo went to America in 1596, visiting the Antilles and Venezuela and landing at Lima in 1599. Entering the Society of Jesus, 14 October 1601, he was sent by his superiors in 1615 to the mission of Juli, where, and at Potosí, Cochabamba, Oruro, and La Paz, he laboured until 1618. He was rector of the college of Arequipa from 1618 until 1621, afterwards at Pisco, and finally at Callao in the same capacity, as late as 1630. He was then sent to Mexico, and remained there until 1650, when he returned to Peru.

== Works ==
He wrote two works, one of which is incomplete. It is also stated that he wrote a work on botany in ten volumes, which, it seems, is lost. Of his main work, Historia del Nuevo Mundo which he finished in 1653, only the first half is known and has appeared in print (four volumes, printed in Seville, 1890 and years succeeding). The remainder, in which he treats, or claims to have treated, of every geographical and political subdivision in detail, was either never finished, or is lost.

His other book appeared in print in 1882, and forms part of the History of the Inca Empire mentioned, but he made a separate manuscript of it in 1639, and so it became published as Historia de la fundación de Lima, a few years before the publication of the principal manuscripts.

The History of the Inca Empire may, in American literature, be compared with one work only, the General and Natural history of the Indies by Oviedo. On the animals and plants of the continent, it is more complete than Nieremberg, Hernandez, and Monardes. In regard to the pre-Columbian past and vestiges, Cobo is, for the South American west coast, a source of primary importance, for close observations of customs and manners, and generally accurate descriptions of the principal ruins of South America.

== Legacy ==
The Spanish botanist Cavanilles gave the name of Cobaea to a genus of plants belonging to the Polemoniaceae of Mexico, Cobaea scandens being its most striking representative.

== Sources ==
- Torres Saldamando, Antiguos Jesuitas del Peru (Lima, 1882);
- Cabanilles, Discures sobre algunos botanicos españoles del siglo XVII in the Anales de historia natural (Madrid, 1804).
