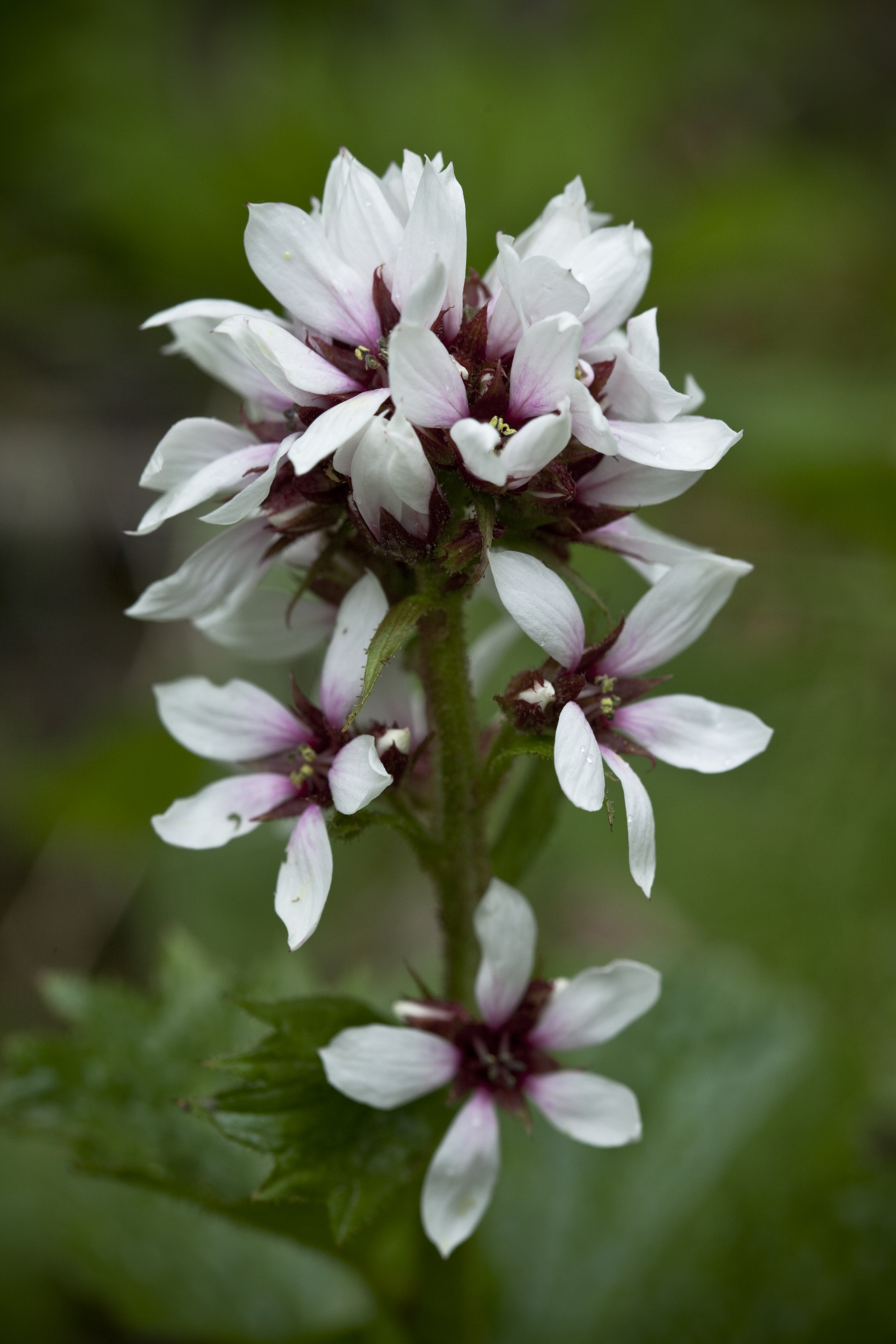

Conservation status
- Apparently Secure (NatureServe)

Scientific classification
- Kingdom: Plantae
- Clade: Tracheophytes
- Clade: Angiosperms
- Clade: Eudicots
- Order: Saxifragales
- Family: Saxifragaceae
- Genus: Boykinia
- Species: B. richardsonii

Binomial name
- Boykinia richardsonii (Hook.) Rothr.

Synonyms
- Saxifraga richardsonii Hook.; Therofon richardsonii (Hook.) Kuntze; Saxifraga nelsoniana Hook. & Arn.; Hemieva richardsonii Raf.

= Boykinia richardsonii =

Species of plant

Boykinia richardsonii is a species of flowering plant in the family Saxifragaceae, endemic to Alaska and the adjacent Canadian territory of Yukon. It is commonly known as Richardson's brookfoam, but has also been called Alaska boykin, bearflower, Richardson's boykin and Richardson's saxifrage. "Bearflower" reflects its popularity with grizzly bears as forage in the summer months when it flowers.

The species is named for Scottish naturalist John Richardson, who first identified it on his mid-1820s exploration of the western Canadian Arctic coast with John Franklin. William Jackson Hooker first described it in Flora Boreali-Americana, the 1833 account of plant species identified on that expedition. It was originally misclassified as part of the genus Saxifraga.

Boykinia richardsonii is believed to have evolved in temperate Arctic forests of the Neogene, or Late Tertiary, period and survived through the ensuing glacial periods since much of Beringia remained an unglaciated refugium. Today it is found at lower elevations in open meadows or tundra, along streams, and sometimes in the shade provided by Arctic willow.

== Description ==
From a system of dark brown rhizomes spreading underground the plant's stem rises 10–60 centimetres (3.9–23.6 in), with capitate trichomes. Reniform basal leaves, 2–7 cm long by 5–11 cm wide, generally one and a half times as wide, sprout from trichomous petioles 2.5–10 cm long. The leaves, glandular-pubescent below and glabrate above with frequent stomata, are shallowly lobed and 2–3 times dentate on the margins. Stipules, 2–5 millimeters long, are either a dilation of the petiole base or foliaceous; the smaller ones are fringed with subulate bristles.

Cauline leaves are similar to the stipules, fringed with brown hair. The plant's inflorescence is narrowly cylindrical, with three flowers on each branch. Its pedicels are densely stipitate-glandular.

At the end of each pedicel is a calyx 6–14 mm long, divided at about half its length into sepals, triangular to lanceolate, another 3–7 mm. The free portion of the hypanthium is another 2–3 mm; its nectary is greenish or purple with an inferior ovary. Petals are white, sometimes with pink veins, ovate, 8–12 by 3–7 mm (generally double or triple the lengths of the sepals) with a cuneate or clawed base. Stamens are 3–5 mm long, generally equal or slightly shorter than the sepals. Filaments are 2–4 times the length of the undehisced anthers.

The plant's capsules are ovoid, turbinate or urceolate. The seeds within are smooth, brown and 1.3–1.9 mm long. Their testae are often creased or folded, but also covered with tubercules, which do not protrude much above the seed coat's surface.

== Taxonomy ==
In 1825, British naval commander John Franklin and naturalist John Richardson headed an expedition to explore and map the coast of the northwestern Canadian Arctic mainland. After traveling overland to the mouth of the Mackenzie River along fur trading routes, the two split up the party between them. Franklin headed west, with the intent of going as far as possible, while Richardson went east with the goal of reaching the mouth of the Coppermine River, which he and Franklin had started east from on an ill-fated similar expedition attempting to reach Hudson Bay several years before. This time both expeditions were successful, with Richardson reaching the Coppermine and Franklin getting as far as Prudhoe Bay in today's Alaska, areas never previously visited by Europeans, and returning.

The two botanists in Richardson's group, Alexander Collie and George Tradescant Lay, discovered the flower and collected a specimen, stored in the Kew Gardens herbarium with the name of Frederick William Beechey, Collie's commanding officer on another expedition, on it. This is likely a mistake as Collie and Lay were the designated botanists under Richardson. So many new species were identified by the expedition that it was necessary to publish one volume for the plants and another for the animals.

William Jackson Hooker wrote Flora Boreali-Americana, the catalog of plant species. He described the plant as Saxifraga richardsonii, saying an earlier identification as Saxifraga nelsoniana was incorrect. Hooker noted that its many glands and acute petals made it unlike any other Saxifraga save jamesii, and that "the two might form a distinct little group." Constantine Samuel Rafinesque alternatively proposed Hemieva richardsonii in 1837, as part of a genus later accepted as Suksdorfia, based on its floral morphology. This was not accepted and later analyses have found it having much more in common with other Boykinia.

Later, after Thomas Nuttall described Boykinia as another genus of the Saxifragaceae family in 1834, richardsonii and jamesii were both reassigned to it in 1868. Otto Kuntze proposed Therofon richardsonii in 1891, but it was rejected.

In 1905, Carl Otto Rosendahl suggested that B. richardsonii belonged in a separate section of the genus which he named Renifolium after its distinctive leaf shape. Adolf Engler validated the idea a quarter-century later. Richard Gornall of Leicester University and Bruce A. Bohm of the University of British Columbia further expanded the idea into several sections of Boykinia in a 1985 Botanical Journal of the Linnean Society monograph, based on distinctions such as richardsonii's five stamens compared to 10 in other species, three-flowered inflorescence, high polyploidy, and flavonoid profile emphasizing flavones in contrast to the more complex flavonols in the other species. They considered it the type species of Renifolium.

=== Etymology ===
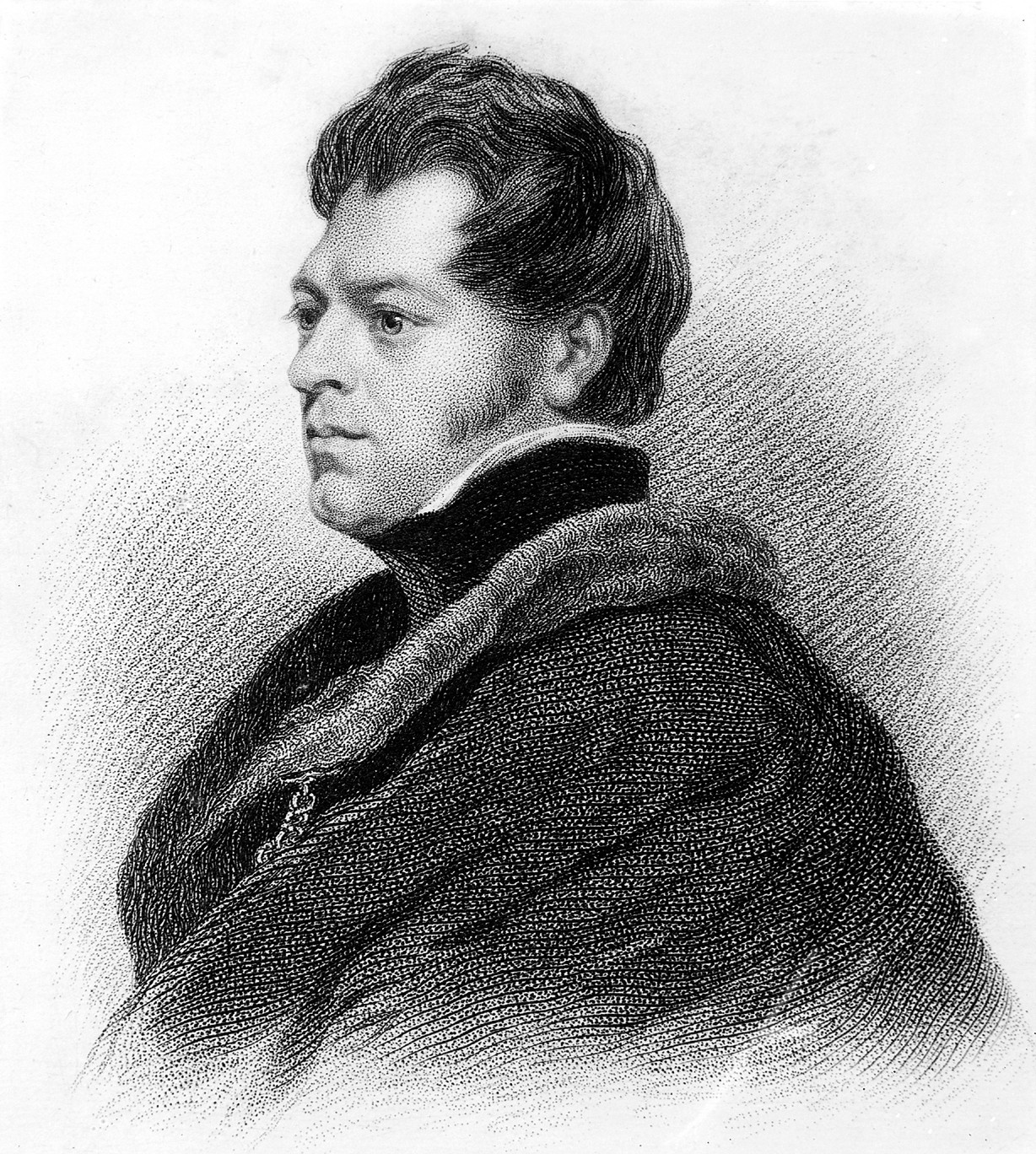
John Richardson in 1828

The species' binomial name recognizes two prominent early 19th-century naturalists. The Boykinia generic name honors plant collector Samuel Boykin of Milledgeville, Georgia. Hooker gave it its specific epithet after Richardson, under whose leadership it was first identified.

Three of its vernacular names also recognize Richardson's role in the form of an initial possessive; they differ in what kind of flower to call it. "Saxifrage" recalls its original generic from before Boykinia was identified and "boykin" is derived from its generic name. "Brookfoam", probably the most commonly used, is the vernacular name for most Boykinia species.

Within Alaska, two other names are common. "Bearflower" reflects its popularity as forage with grizzly bears during the summer months. Hultén, and some other sources, use "Alaska boykinia". "I'm definitely learning that if it is found in Alaska, it's going to end up with some variation of 'Alaska' or 'Alaskan' in a name," wildlife photographer Lee Petersen remarked on this name in 2021, "and that's what Alaskans will call it, no matter how widely distributed it is."

== Distribution and habitat ==
Delineations of the species' range vary but most agree on an area running across the Alaska North Slope into the foothills of the Brooks Range up to elevations of 400 m (1,300 ft), thence across the Canada–United States border through the Arctic National Wildlife Refuge (ANWR) into northern Yukon and Ivvavik National Park, where it turns south through Vuntut National Park, then bending southwest through the Porcupine River valley to finish at the Alaska Range, found as high up the slopes as 1,700 m (5,600 ft) in Denali National Park and Preserve. Some maps show isolated areas on the Seward Peninsula and the Norton Sound coast. Others extend it along the Arctic coast into the Northwest Territories to the Coppermine, the area where Richardson's team found the first specimens identified, or the entirety of northern Alaska.

Two early 20th century expeditions reported finding specimens across the Bering Strait, in eastern Siberia. While Eric Hultén did not confirm this, he found it "very probable" that B. richardsonii would occur there as well. But it is not reported in either of the two most comprehensive Soviet-era catalogs of plants. As a result, it is believed today that the two earlier reports of its occurrence in Siberia were mistaken. The Global Biodiversity Information Facility records 17 occurrences in an area of the Swedish Arctic near the border with Norway, since 2006.

Specimens from different areas of the range have been recorded as widely varying in their chromosome counts. A 1968 study of those from the Brooks Range found those had 84, a 2n count way above that typical for the genus, while eight years later Alaska Range specimens were found to have 36. The only difference found in plants from the two regions is the greater equatorial diameter of pollen grains in the Brooks Range samples.

Gornall and Bohm found this distinction merited further study if confirmed. They speculated it might correlate with plants growing in regions that were glaciated during the last Ice Age and those that were not, such as the ANWR, Ivavvik and Vuntut parks along the northern Alaska–Yukon border. B. richardsonii evolved prior to that time, during the Neogene (Late Tertiary) period 25–10 million years ago, when according to the fossil record from the Seward Peninsula much of today's Alaska was heavily forested, dominated by a mix of temperate species like hazelnut and hemlock with boreal species larch and spruce. When the glaciers came, many species native to these forests either migrated southward or went extinct. The Beringia refugium created in the areas not glaciated allowed B. richardsonii and some of the other species from these forests to survive in their original range, although they have remained endemic to it long after the glaciers' retreat.

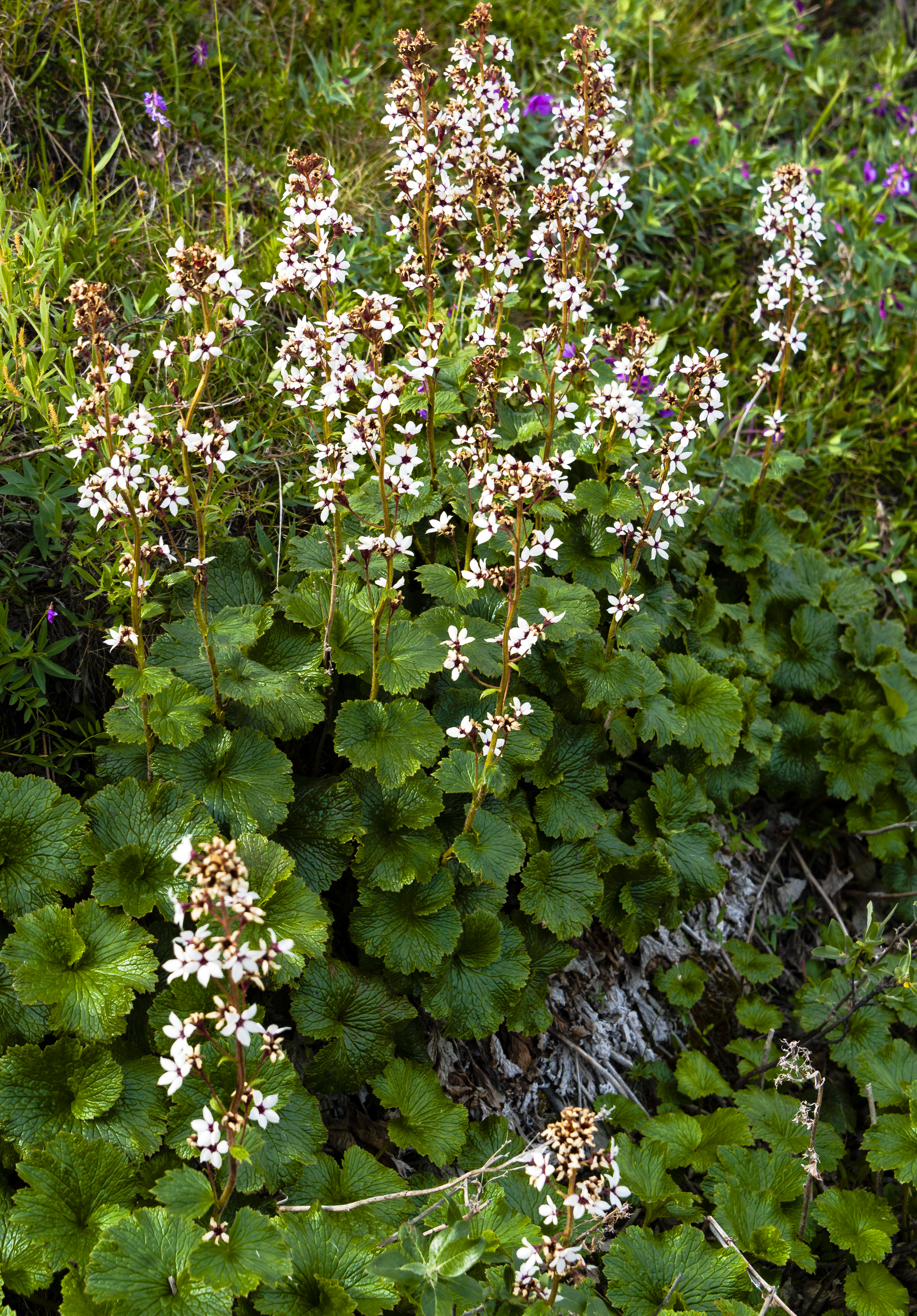
B. richardsonii on the banks of the Firth River in Ivvavik National Park

With much less forest cover remaining today in its range, B. richardsonii has adapted to life on the mostly treeless tundra, where it flowers during the brief summer months, from June to August. It most commonly grows in the gullies formed by streams or the meltwater between snow patches that linger into early summer. Patches that grow in the shade of dwarf shrubs, mostly various Salix species, particularly Salix arctica, recall the species' sylvan beginnings. In the southern part of its range, it also occurs on the edges of, and just outside, subalpine forests. Throughout its range it is a calcicole, preferring soil rich in lime.

== Ecology ==
In the Denali area, B. richardsonii has been observed to be popular grizzly bear forage in the summertime, so much so that it has come to be known locally as bearflower. A University of Montana graduate student who devoted his master's thesis to the feeding habits of grizzlies on barren ground in the Alaskan Arctic said the species was by far the most popular plant with them (although in some areas the bears ignored it in favor of the local grasses). A similar study that followed bears with radiocollars around the Firth River valley in Ivvavik National Park, near the northern end of the plant's range, found they were likewise the most popular plant with the bears there.

Adolph Murie observed the plant's popularity with grizzlies during his studies in Alaska, once watching a bear spend two hours leisurely consuming richardsonii in a large patch (although it was more common for bears to consume it as part of a rotation of whatever plants were locally available, especially when that included horsetail, another favorite). He noted the flowers seemed to particularly interest the bears, often to the exclusion of the rest of the plant, although in one case he saw a bear discard the flowers and concentrate on the stems and leaves.

In 1963, Murie recalled, he found even greater evidence than usual of richardsonii's popularity with grizzlies. That summer followed a heavier than usual winter, and snowbanks lingered later into the summer than usual. Berries, which grizzlies usually turn to foraging in the late summer months as the nutritional content of herbaceous plants declines, were consequently scarce. But the late snowmelt also resulted in a more abundant growth of richardsonii than usual for August, and Murie saw large patches thoroughly grazed. Scat he analyzed at the time was correspondingly heavy with evidence of its consumption, and one sample he collected around the September equinox that year showed no evidence that the bear had eaten any berries, only richardsonii, the latest he recalled that ever having been the case.

Bears are not the only species that consume B. richardsonii. Gornall and Bohm reported seeing some plants with their capsules broken open, suggesting to them that birds feed on the seeds.

== Aesthetics ==
Many observers have commented favorably on B. richardsonii's appearance. Hooker called it "truly handsome", Hultén describes it as "magnificent" Pielou calls it "showy" and Murie called its inforescence "conspicuous". The U.S. National Park Service says the species is easily identifiable around Denali due to its "straight spike of white-pink flowers and kidney-shaped leaves covered in a waxy layer—no other plant in the park has this combination of characteristics."

Murie's widow, Louise, said after her 100th birthday, upon the publication of McKinley Flora, a collaboration with her husband that was published in 2012, having been thought lost for half a century, that B. richardsonii was her favorite Denali flower. "It was so changeable. The petals were mostly white, but in the center of each flower there was kind of a rose color. It's hard to describe those flowers, they're so complicated."
