= Brickellia pringlei =

Scientific classification
- Kingdom: Plantae
- Clade: Tracheophytes
- Clade: Angiosperms
- Clade: Eudicots
- Clade: Asterids
- Order: Asterales
- Family: Asteraceae
- Genus: Brickellia
- Species: B. pringlei

Binomial name
- Brickellia pringlei A.Gray

Synonyms
- Coleosanthus pringlei (A.Gray) Kuntze

Species of flowering plant

Brickellia pringlei, or Pringle's brickellbush, is a North American species of flowering plants in the family Asteraceae. It is native to northern Mexico (Chihuahua, Sonora, Sinaloa) and the southwestern United States (southern Arizona).

Brickellia pringlei is abranching shrub up to 80 cm (24 inches) tall, growing from a woody caudex. It produces many small flower heads with pale yellow disc florets but no ray florets.

The species is named for American botanist Cyrus Guernsey Pringle (1838–1911).
