= Cathedral bells =

Cathedral bells is a common name for several plants and may refer to:

- Bryophyllum pinnatum, native to Madagascar
- Cobaea scandens, native to Mexico
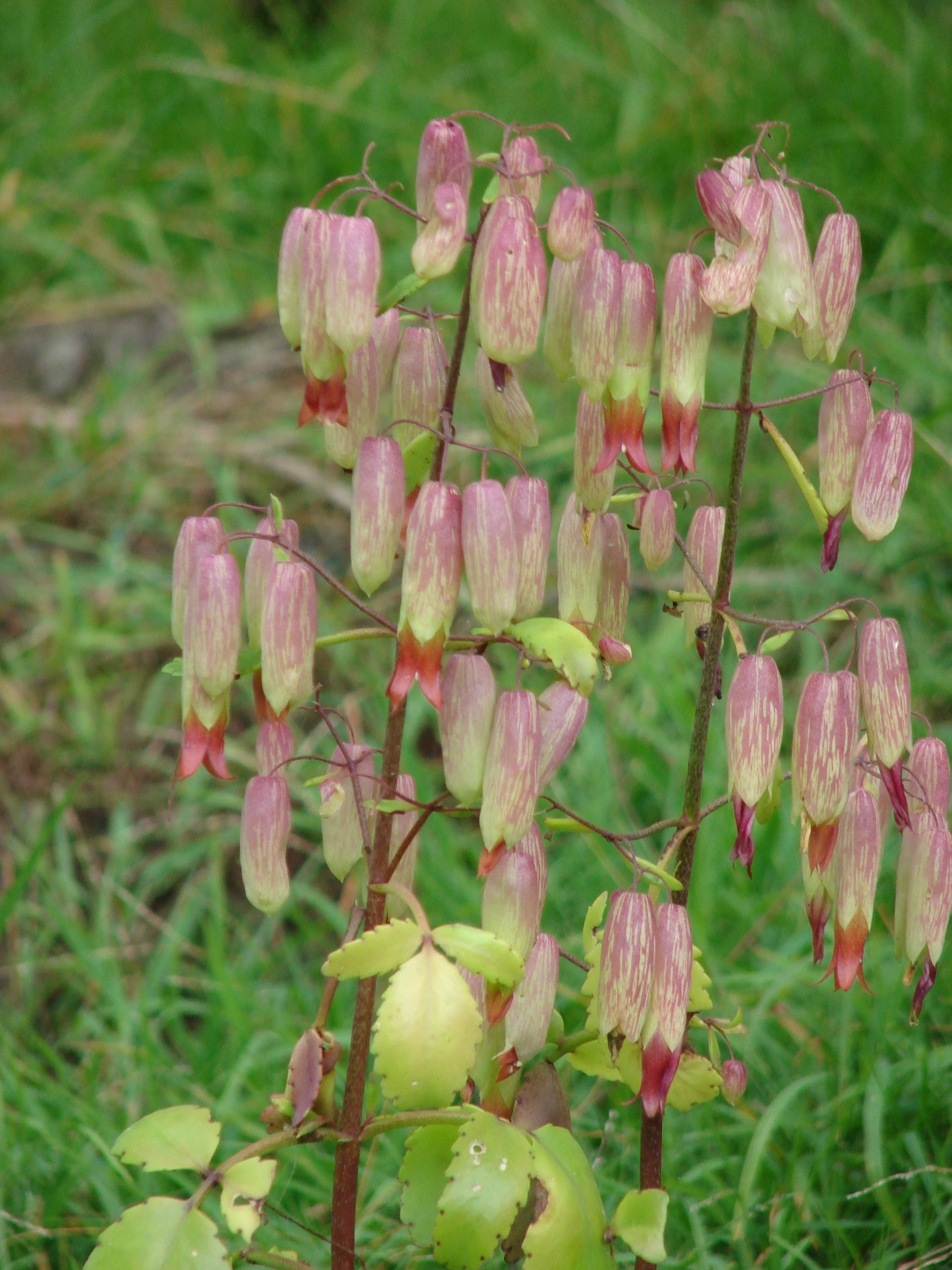
Bryophyllum pinnatum

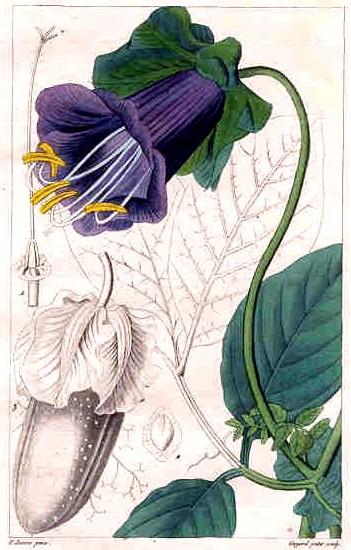
Cobaea scandens
