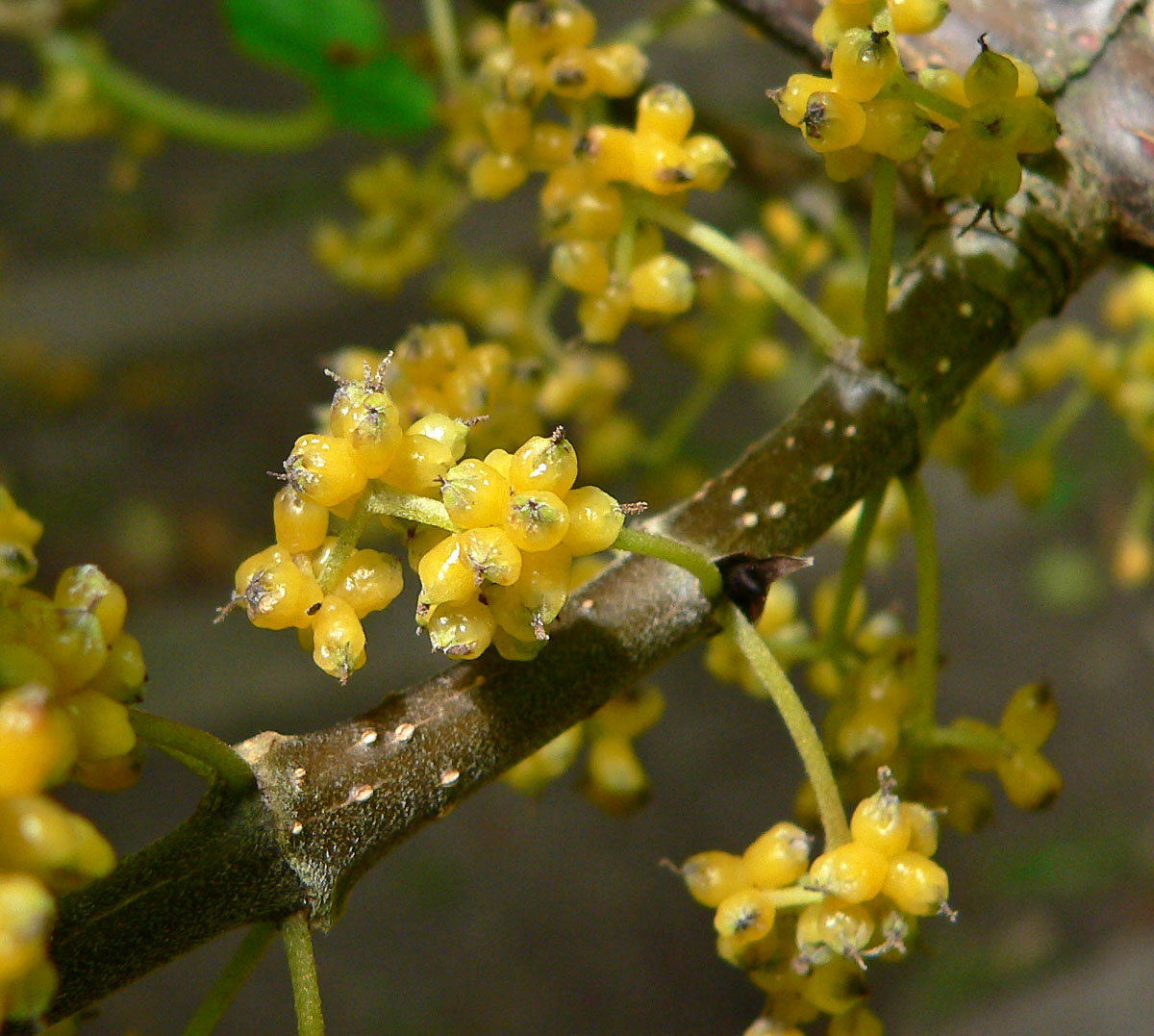
- Lozanella enantiophylla at the San Francisco Botanical Garden

Scientific classification
- Kingdom: Plantae
- Clade: Tracheophytes
- Clade: Angiosperms
- Clade: Eudicots
- Clade: Rosids
- Order: Rosales
- Family: Cannabaceae
- Genus: Lozanella; Greenm.

= Lozanella =

Genus of flowering plant

Lozanella is a genus of flowering plants belonging to the family Cannabaceae.

Its native range is Mexico to Venezuela and Peru. It is also found in the countries of Bolivia, Colombia, Costa Rica, Ecuador, El Salvador, Guatemala, Honduras and Panamá.

The genus name of Lozanella is in honour of José Filemón Guadalupe Lozano y Lozano (1877 – after 1940), the Mexican assistant of and botanical collector for Cyrus Pringle during his Mexican expedition.

It was first described and published in Proc. Amer. Acad. Arts Vol.41 on page 236 in 1905.

Known species, according to Kew;

- Lozanella enantiophylla (Donn.Sm.) Killip & C.V.Morton
- Lozanella permollis Killip & C.V.Morton
