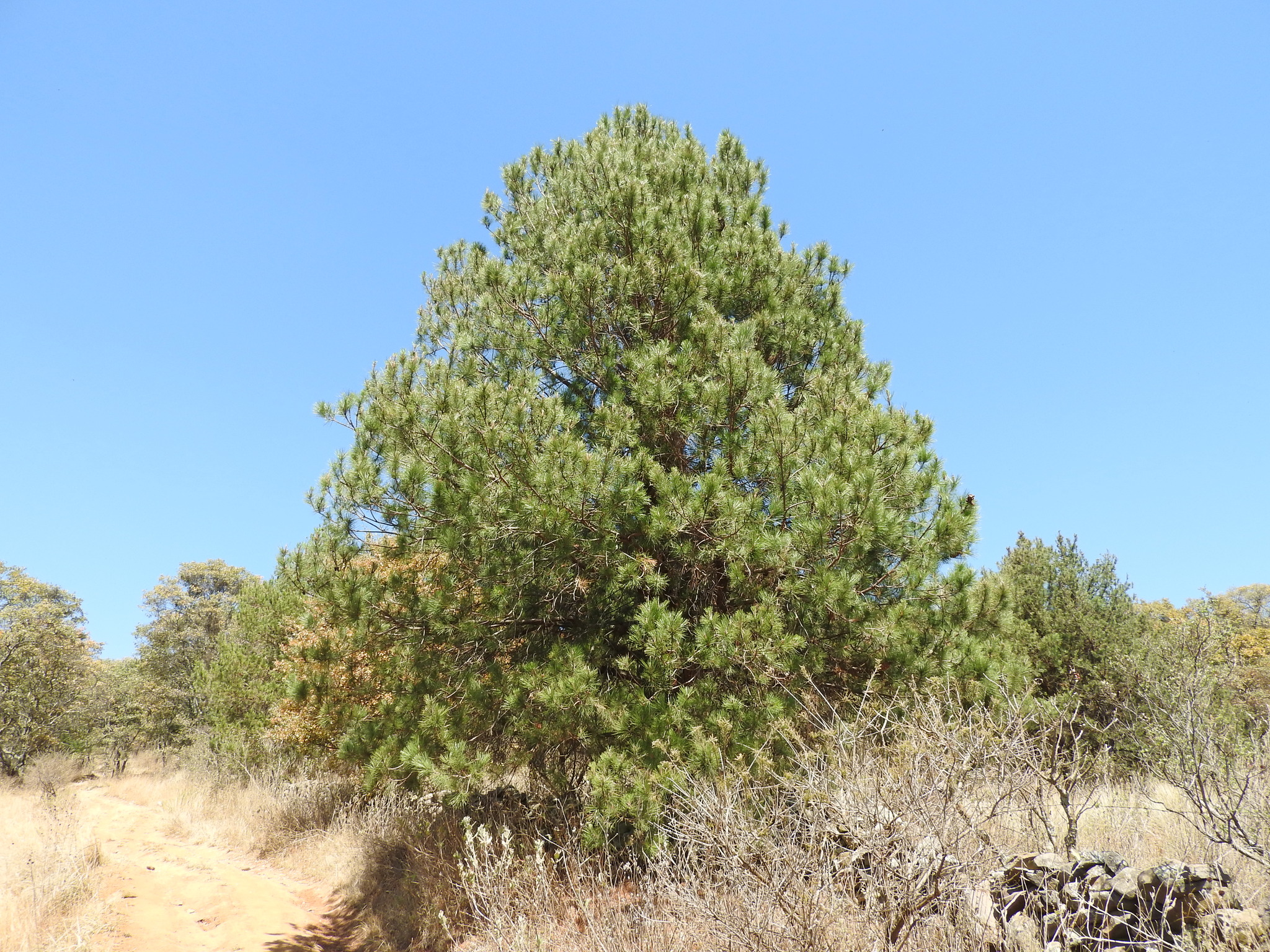

Conservation status
- Least Concern (IUCN 3.1)

Scientific classification
- Kingdom: Plantae
- Clade: Tracheophytes
- Clade: Gymnosperms
- Division: Pinophyta
- Class: Pinopsida
- Order: Pinales
- Family: Pinaceae
- Genus: Pinus
- Subgenus: P. subg. Pinus
- Section: P. sect. Trifoliae
- Subsection: P. subsect. Australes
- Species: P. pringlei

Binomial name
- Pinus pringlei Shaw
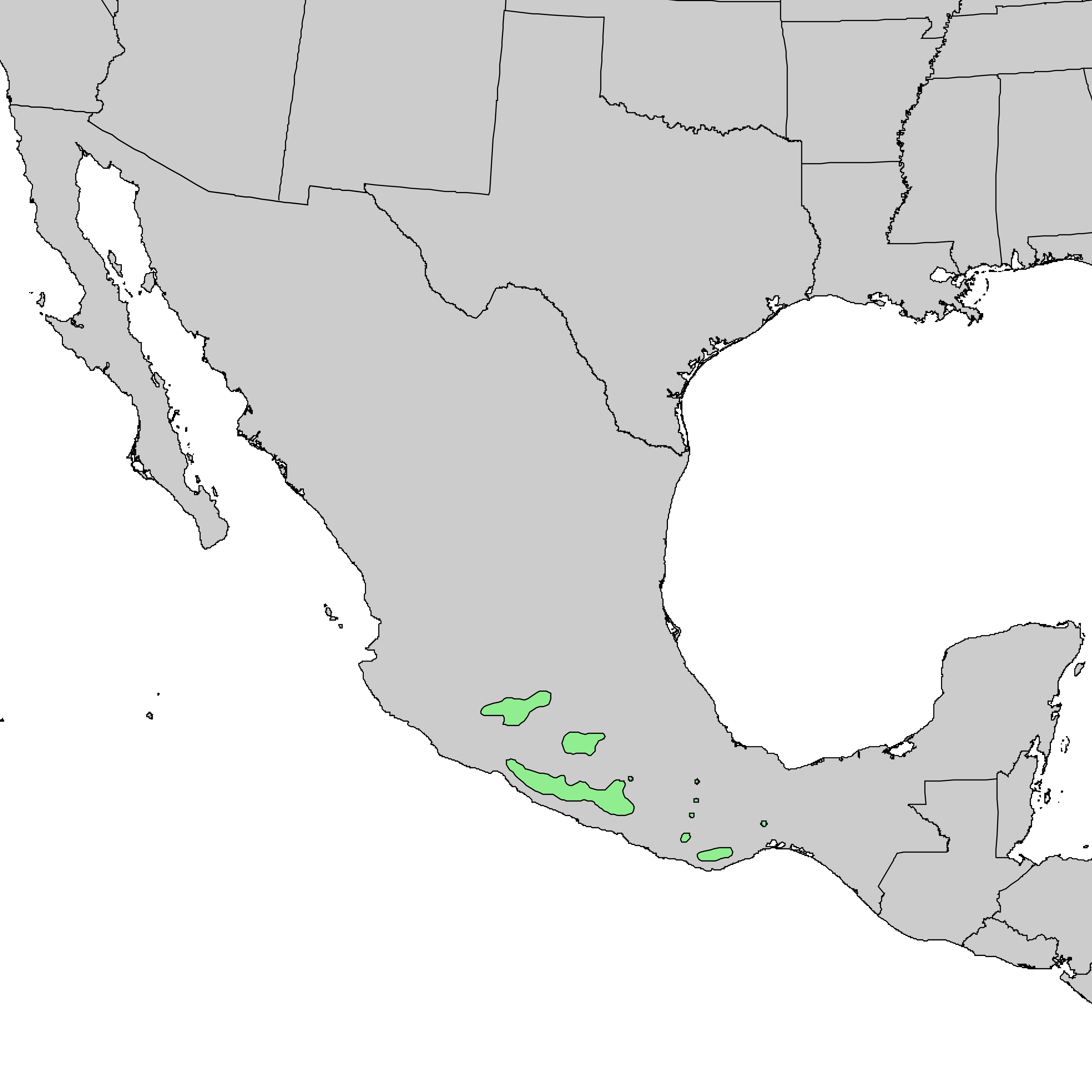
- Natural range of Pinus pringlei

= Pinus pringlei =

Species of conifer

Pinus pringlei, commonly known as Pringle's pine, is a species of conifer in the family Pinaceae. It is a pine tree endemic to Southern Mexico. The specific epithet, pringlei, honours Cyrus Guernsey Pringle (1838–1911), an American botanist, explorer and plant breeder.
