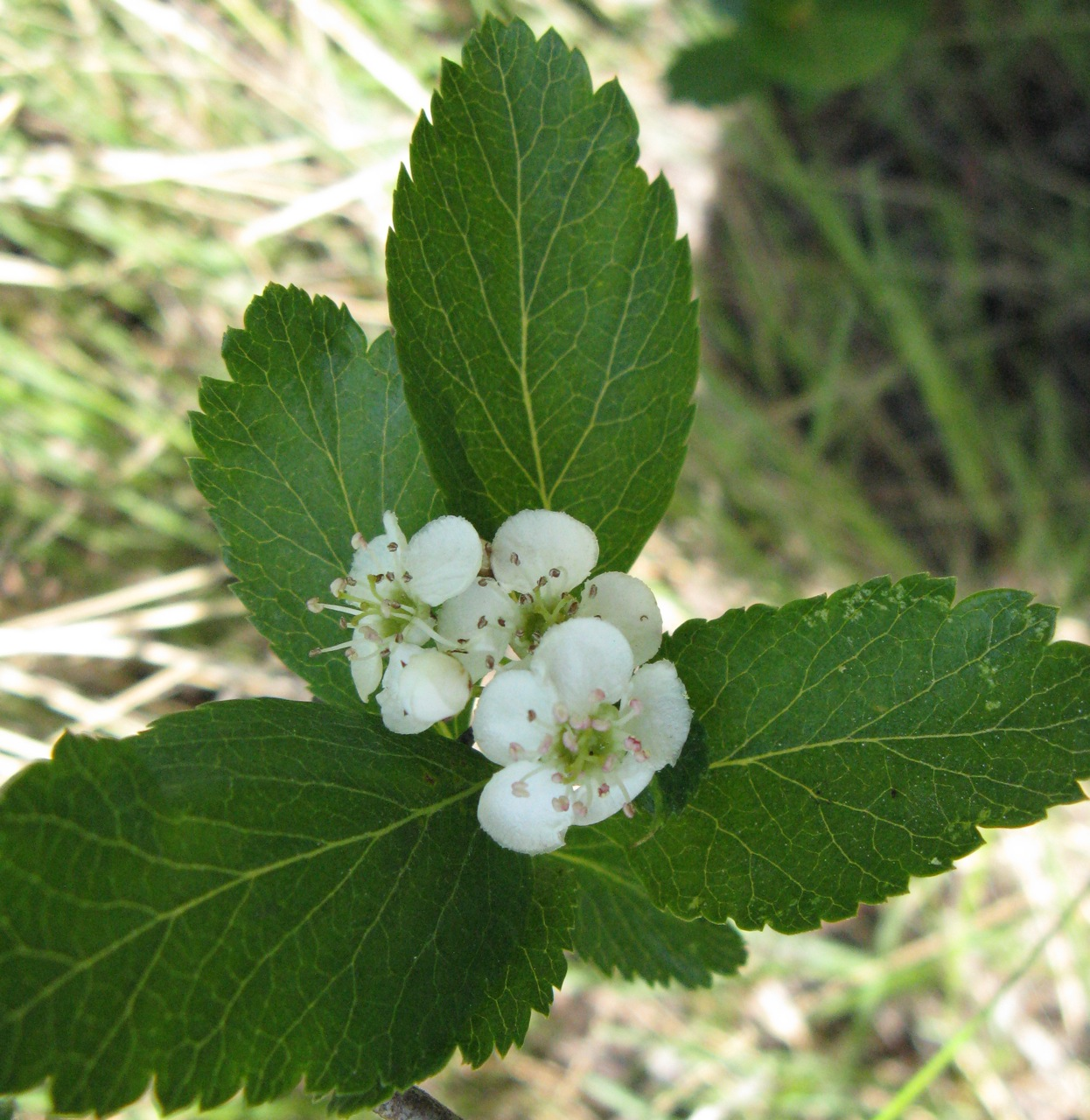

Scientific classification
- Kingdom: Plantae
- Clade: Tracheophytes
- Clade: Angiosperms
- Clade: Eudicots
- Clade: Rosids
- Order: Rosales
- Family: Rosaceae
- Genus: Crataegus
- Species: C. suksdorfii

Binomial name
- Crataegus suksdorfii (Sarg.) Kruschke

= Crataegus suksdorfii =

Species of hawthorn

Crataegus suksdorfii, (Suksdorf's hawthorn), formerly Crataegus douglasii var. suksdorfii, is a species of hawthorn found in the Pacific Northwest.

== Description ==
It grows up to 5 metres (16 ft) in height, with green, toothed leaves, and white flowers. The fruit is a dark purple pome 1.5 centimetres (1/2 in) across.

It is diploid versus tetraploid for Crataegus douglasii. The most significant morphological difference from C. douglasii is that it has 20 stamens rather than 10. The two species are found in different geographic ranges, have different flowering times, and different time lengths for fruit development.
