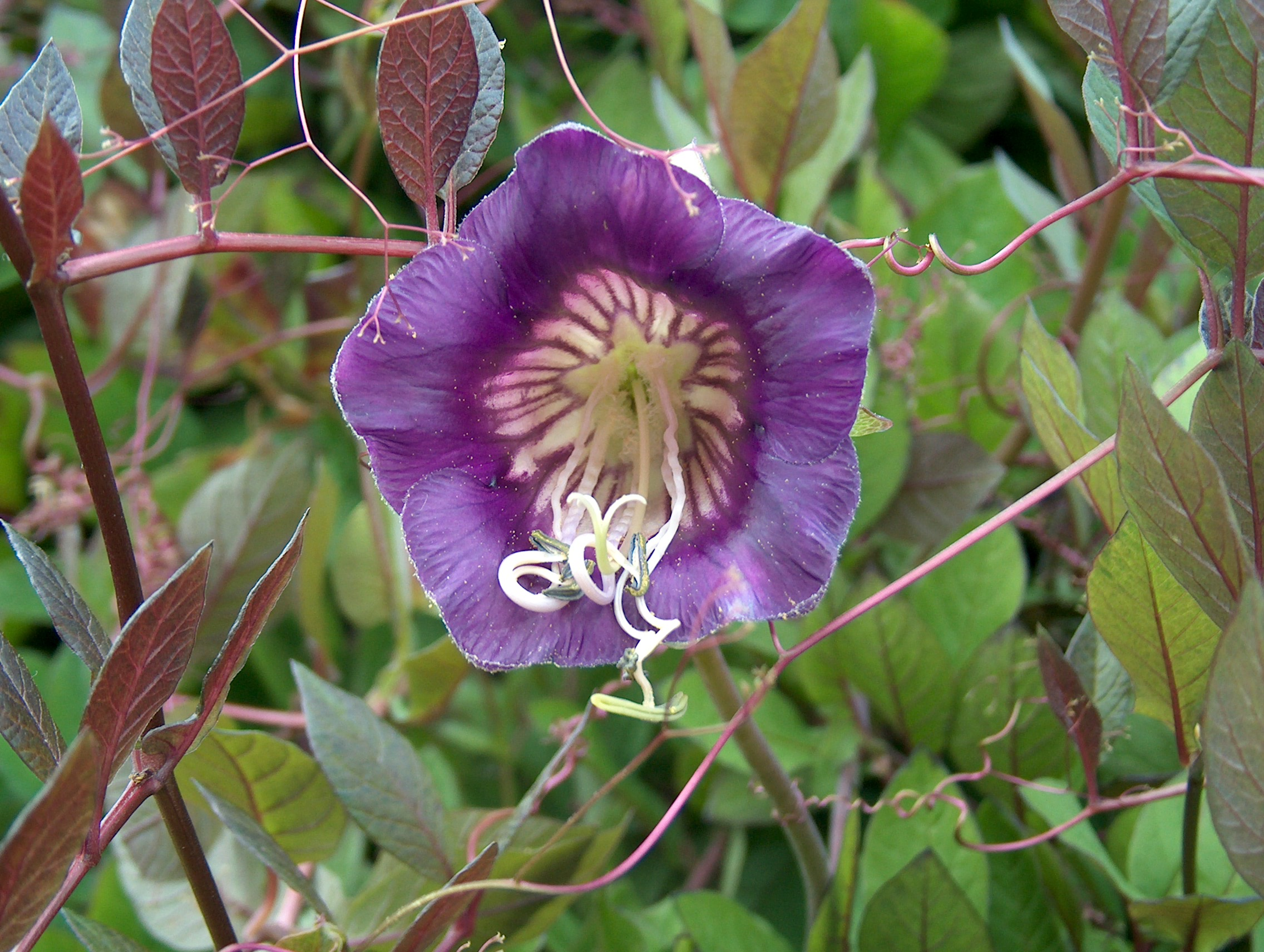
- C. scandens

Scientific classification
- Kingdom: Plantae
- Clade: Tracheophytes
- Clade: Angiosperms
- Clade: Eudicots
- Clade: Asterids
- Order: Ericales
- Family: Polemoniaceae
- Genus: Cobaea; Cav. (1791)

Species
- See text

Synonyms
- Rosenbergia Oerst. (1856)

= Cobaea =

Genus of vines

Cobaea is a genus of flowering plants including about 20 species of rapid growing, ornamental climbers whose native range extends from Mexico to Peru. The botanical name honors Father Bernabé Cobo, Spanish Jesuit of the seventeenth century, naturalist, and resident of America for many years. The woody stems can reach 20 ft (6 m). Leaves are alternate lobed with opposite pairs and tendrils. In late summer to early spring, the large, bell-shaped flowers are borne profusely and singly along the stems with bright green, violet, or purple in colors. The plants can become invasive in some areas, and are common weeds in New Zealand.

== Species ==
17 species are accepted.

- Cobaea aequatoriensis Aspl.
- Cobaea aschersoniana Brand
- Cobaea campanulata Hemsl.
- Cobaea flava Prather
- Cobaea gracilis (Oerst.) Hemsl.
- Cobaea lutea D.Don
- Cobaea minor M.Martens & Galeotti
- Cobaea pachysepala Standl.
- Cobaea paneroi Prather
- Cobaea penduliflora (H.Karst.) Hook.f.
- Cobaea pringlei (House) Standl.
- Cobaea rotundiflora Prather
- Cobaea scandens Cav. – cathedral bells, cup and saucer vine
- Cobaea skutchii I.M.Johnst.
- Cobaea stipularis Benth.
- Cobaea trianae Hemsl.
- Cobaea triflora Donn.Sm.
