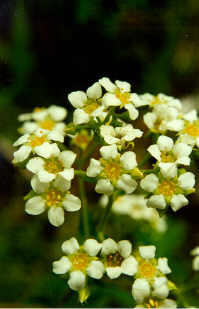

Scientific classification
- Kingdom: Plantae
- Clade: Tracheophytes
- Clade: Angiosperms
- Clade: Eudicots
- Order: Saxifragales
- Family: Saxifragaceae
- Genus: Boykinia
- Species: B. major

Binomial name
- Boykinia major A.Gray

= Boykinia major =

Species of flowering plant

Boykinia major is a species of flowering plant in the saxifrage family known by the common name large boykinia. It is native to the western United States from California to Montana, where it grows in shady forest understory and wet mountain meadows. It is a rhizomatous perennial herb producing large leaves with blades up to 50 centimeters long, borne on petioles up to 35 centimeters in length. Each leaf has several lobes which are often sharply toothed along the edges. The inflorescence reaches up to a meter tall on a thin stem. It bears a dense, flat-topped array of many small white flowers with yellowish centers, each with five pointed sepals and five larger rounded or oval petals.
