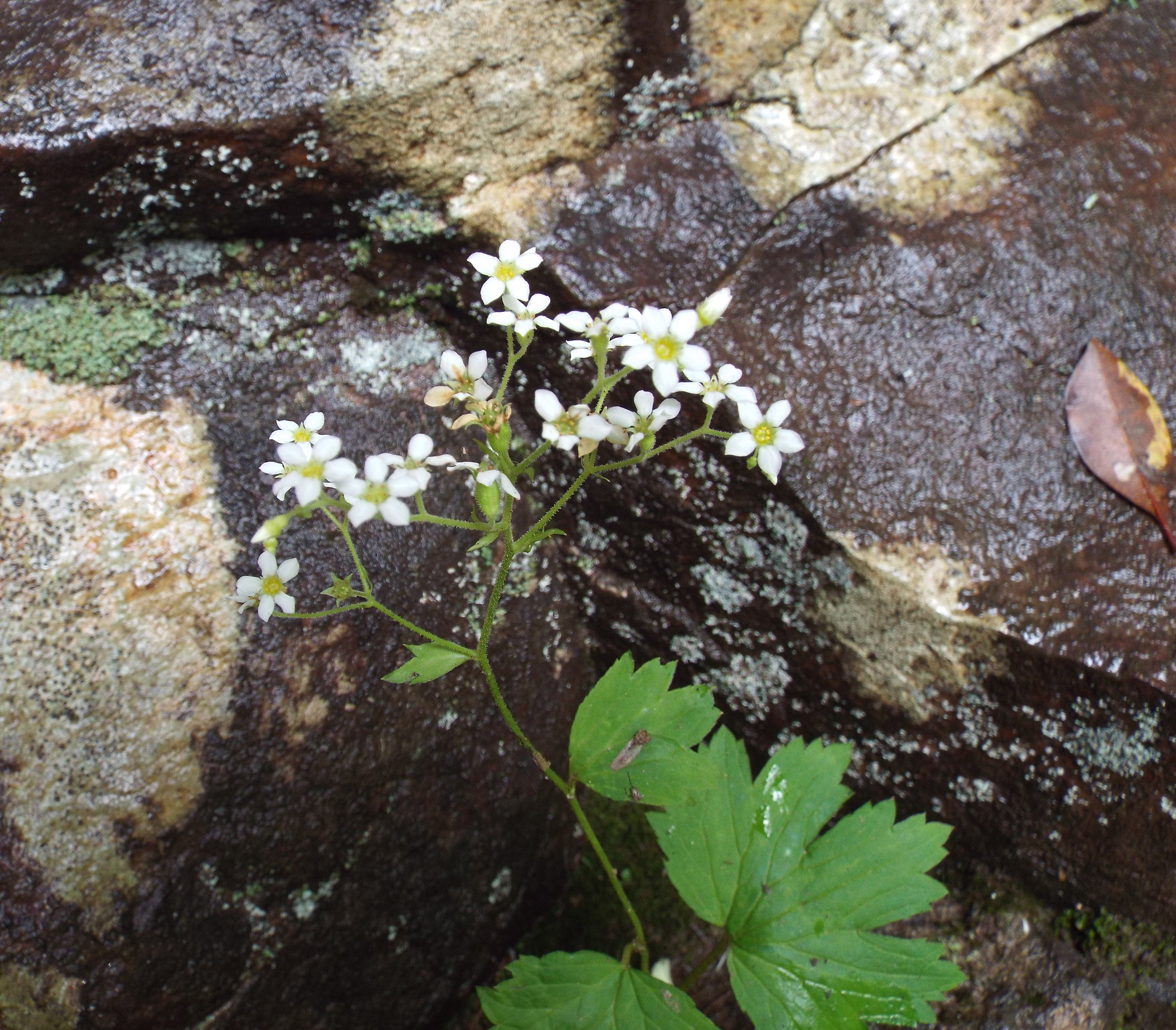

Scientific classification
- Kingdom: Plantae
- Clade: Tracheophytes
- Clade: Angiosperms
- Clade: Eudicots
- Order: Saxifragales
- Family: Saxifragaceae
- Genus: Boykinia
- Species: B. aconitifolia

Binomial name
- Boykinia aconitifolia Nutt.

Synonyms
- Boykinia turbinata (Rydberg) Fedde; Saxifraga aconitifolia (Nuttall) Fielding & Gardner; Therofon aconitifolium (Nuttall) Millspaugh; Therofon turbinatum Rydberg

= Boykinia aconitifolia =

Species of flowering plant

Boykinia aconitifolia, also known as Brook saxifrage and Allegheny brookfoam, is a species of vascular plant in the genus Boykinia. It is native to the southeastern region of the United States, ranging from West Virginia to Alabama and Georgia. It grows in wet woodlands, on the edges of ponds and lakes, or in other moist areas, flowering in the summer. It has both basal and cauline leaves, with petioles three to eighteen centimeters long. Leaves are generally reniform, but can be orbiculate to cordate with three to seven lobes. The seeds are black with tubercles.

According to the Southern Appalachian Species Viability Project, Boykinia aconitifolia is at high risk due to sedimentation and other pollutants.
