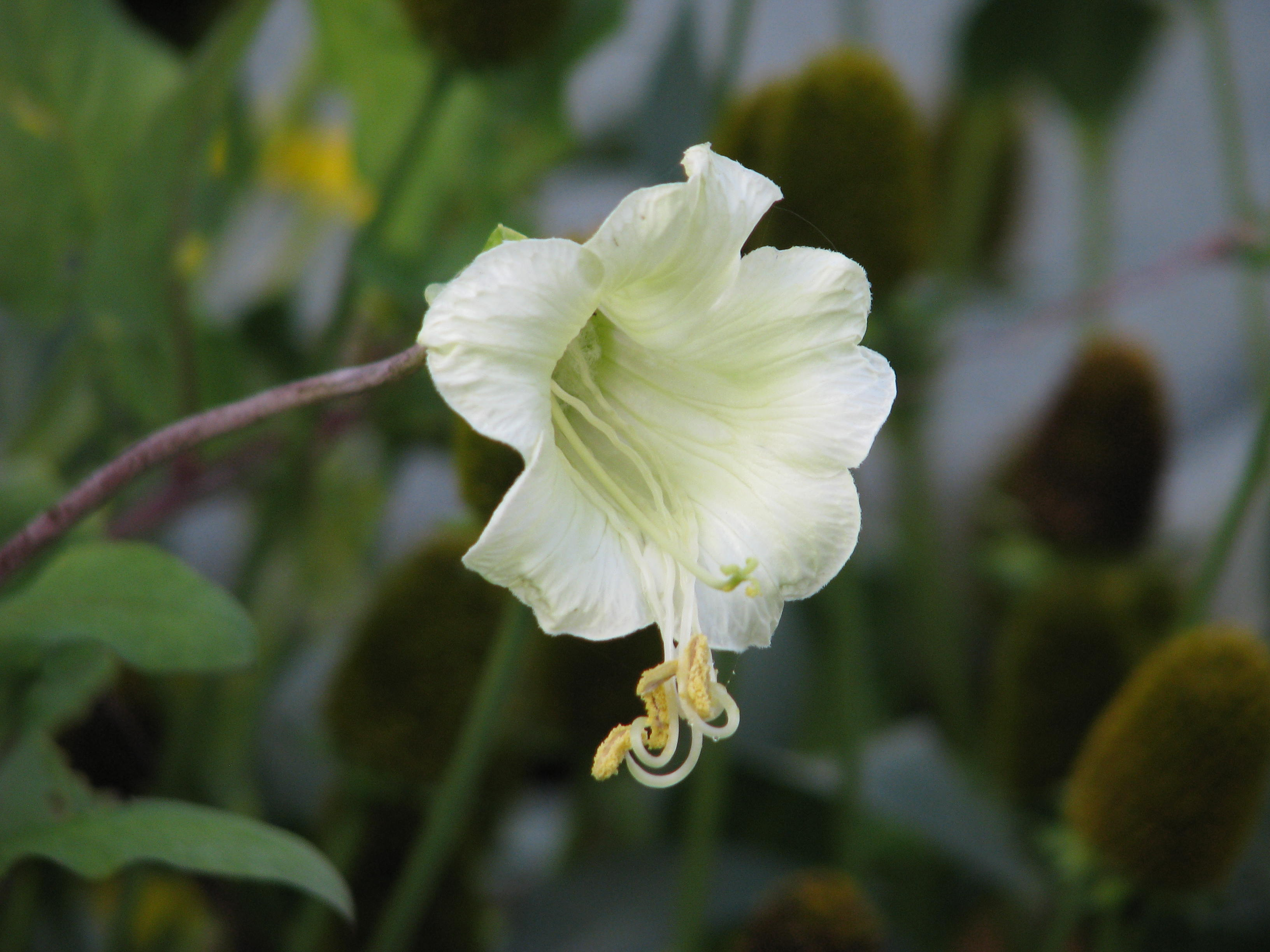

Scientific classification
- Kingdom: Plantae
- Clade: Tracheophytes
- Clade: Angiosperms
- Clade: Eudicots
- Clade: Asterids
- Order: Ericales
- Family: Polemoniaceae
- Genus: Cobaea
- Species: C. pringlei

Binomial name
- Cobaea pringlei Standl.

= Cobaea pringlei =

Species of flowering plant

Cobaea pringlei is a species of flowering perennial plant of the Polemoniaceae family, native to Mexico. It has a climbing habit, clinging by coiling leaf tendrils like other species of the genus. In cultivation it can reach 5–7 m (16–23 ft). The flowers are creamy-white, funnel-shaped, and borne on long stalks. The stamens and style project from the mouth of the flower.

The specific epithet, pringlei, honours Cyrus Guernsey Pringle (1838–1911), an American botanist, explorer and plant breeder.

It is cultivated for its climbing habit and its ornamental flowers. It is rated H4 on the RHS hardiness scale, i.e. hardy to −10 °C to −5 °C, and may be cut to the ground during winters colder than this. A sheltered site with moist but well-drained soil is recommended. It can also be grown under protection, such as in a conservatory.
