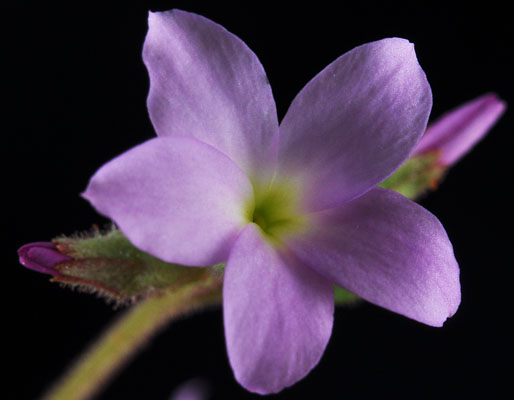

Scientific classification
- Kingdom: Plantae
- Clade: Tracheophytes
- Clade: Angiosperms
- Clade: Eudicots
- Order: Saxifragales
- Family: Saxifragaceae
- Genus: Suksdorfia
- Species: S. violacea

Binomial name
- Suksdorfia violacea Gray

Synonyms
- Hemieva violacea (A. Gray) Wheelock

= Suksdorfia violacea =

Species of flowering plant

Suksdorfia violacea is an uncommon species of herbaceous flowering plant in the saxifrage family known by the common name violet suksdorfia. In 1879 Asa Gray named the genus Suksdorfia after Wilhelm Nikolaus Suksdorf who had first collected a specimen of S. violacea in 1878 near Mount Adams-White Salmon, Washington and sent it to Gray for assistance in classifying it. Gray and Suksdorf had a long and close working relationship, and Gray initially identified and named various species found by Suksdorf. Its conservation status has been rated by NatureServe as "G4 – Apparently Secure".

== Taxonomy ==
Suksdorfia violacea is the type species for this genus and Gray named it after Suksdorf. The genus name Hemieva Raf. was published earlier than Suksdorfia, but was less well known, and Suksdorfia is now a conserved name. Therefore, Hemieva violacea, although correct when it was published in 1896 is no longer the correct name for this species.

== Ecology ==
Suksdorfia violacea is found in Washington, British Columbia, Oregon, Alberta, Montana, and Idaho. It is most common in Washington and southeast British Columbia. It prefers moist areas with rocks, crevices, ledges, and fences. It is a perennial that grows from rhizomes. It has petiolate rounded leaves that are 1–2.5 centimeters (0.39–0.98 in) wide. The calyx is a slender bell shape. The flower is a five-lobed, violet-colored, slender, tapered, and with 5 stamens. The fruits are 4–6 millimeters (0.16–0.24 in) long and have 0.5 millimeters (0.020 in) brown seeds. The plants usually grow to a height of 10–20 centimeters (3.9–7.9 in) in small groups at lower elevations.

== Bibliography ==
- Jones, George Neville (April 1933). "Wilhelm N. Suksdorf". Washington Historical Quarterly. 24 (2).
- Kershaw, Linda (2001). Rare Vascular Plants of Alberta. Calgary: University of Alberta Press. ISBN 0-88864-319-5.
- Love, Rhoda M. (Fall 1998). "Wilhelm Nikolaus Suksdorf (1850-1932) Pioneer Botanist of the Pacific Northwest" (PDF). Pacific Northwest Quarterly.
- Nicolson, Dan; Wiersema, John. "Proposals and Disposals: An Accounting of Algal, Fungal, and Plant Nomenclature Proposals". Smithsonian National Museum of Natural History.
- Qian, Hong; Klinka, Karel (1998). Plants of British Columbia. Seattle: University of Washington Press. ISBN 978-0-774-80652-7.
- "Hemieva violacea (A. Gray) Wheelock". The Plant List Kew Gardens.
- "Suksdorfia violacea". Nature Serve Explorer. 2015.
- "Suksdorfia violacea". Pacific Northwest Flowers. 2013.
- "Suksdorfia violacea". Tropicos.
- "Suksdorfia violacea". Washington State University Herbarium. 2015.
- "Suksdorfia violacea A. Gray". University of British Columbia. 2015.
- "Violet Suksdorfia - Suksdorfia violacea". State of Montana. 2015.
