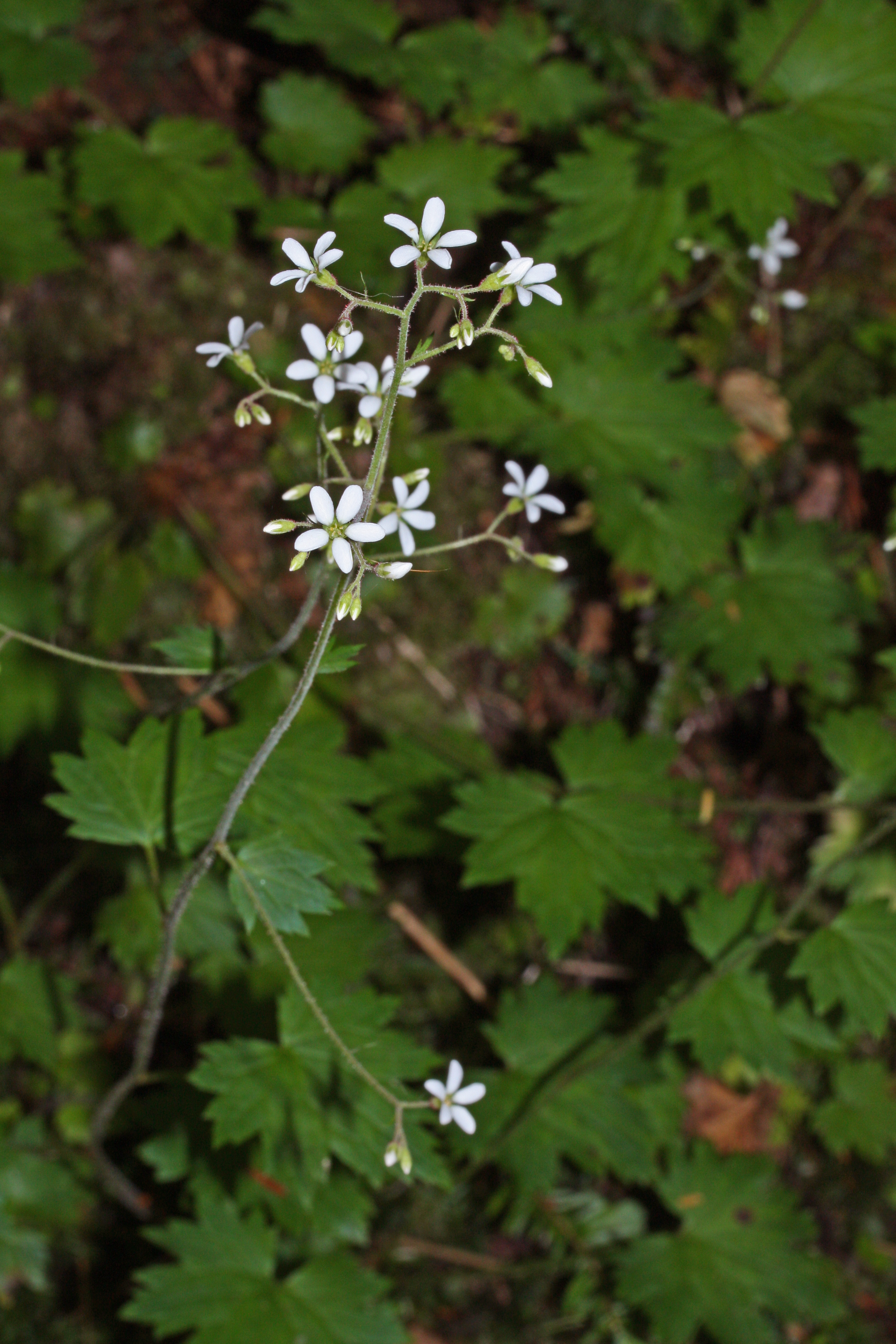

Scientific classification
- Kingdom: Plantae
- Clade: Tracheophytes
- Clade: Angiosperms
- Clade: Eudicots
- Order: Saxifragales
- Family: Saxifragaceae
- Genus: Boykinia
- Species: B. occidentalis

Binomial name
- Boykinia occidentalis Torr. & A.Gray

Synonyms
- Boykinia elata Boykinia vancouverensis Saxifraga elata Nutt. ex Torr. & A. Gray

= Boykinia occidentalis =

Species of flowering plant

Boykinia occidentalis is a species of flowering plant in the saxifrage family known by the common name coastal brookfoam. It is native to the west coast of North America from British Columbia to California, where it grows in shady areas near riverbanks and streams. It is a rhizomatous perennial herb producing large, rounded leaves with blades up to 45 centimeters long and 12 wide, borne on petioles up to 30 centimeters in length. Each leaf has several rounded lobes with dull teeth along the edges. The inflorescence reaches 30 to 60 centimeters tall on a thin stem. It bears an open array of many small white flowers, each with five tiny pointed sepals and five larger oval petals.

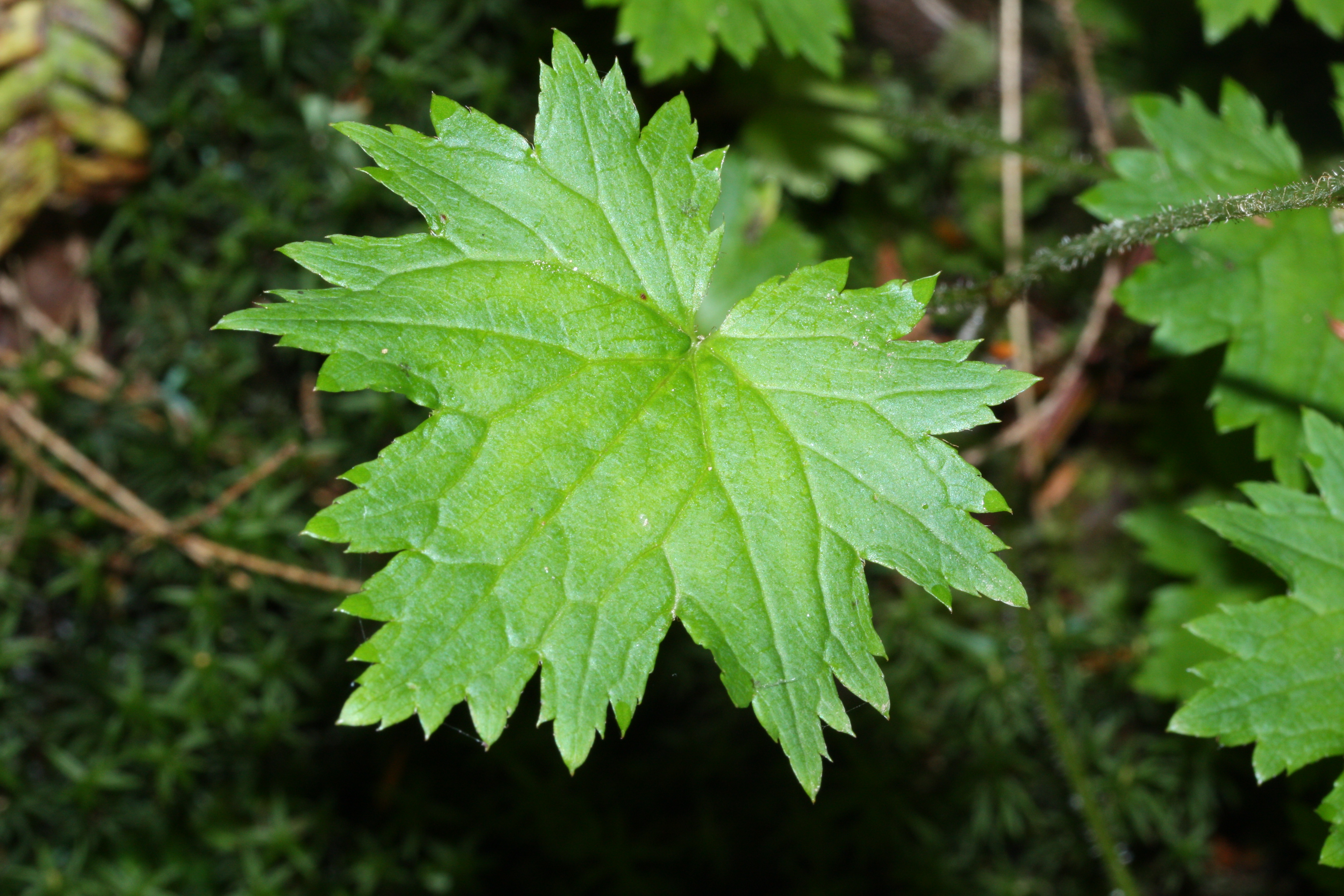
