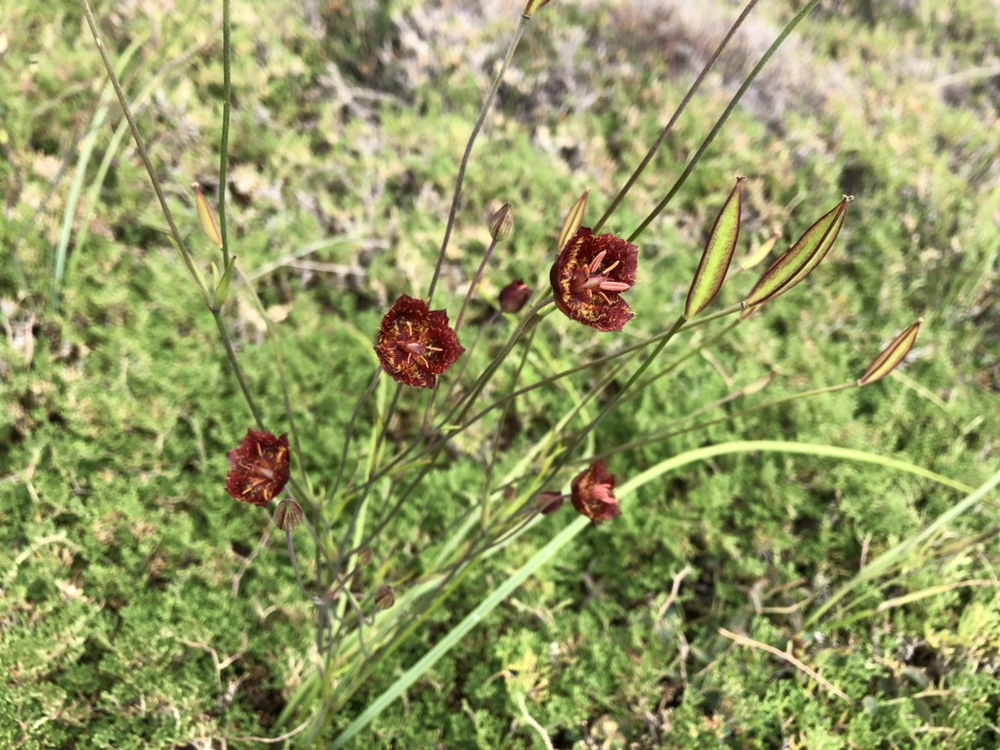

Scientific classification
- Kingdom: Plantae
- Clade: Tracheophytes
- Clade: Angiosperms
- Clade: Monocots
- Order: Liliales
- Family: Liliaceae
- Genus: Calochortus
- Species: C. pringlei

Binomial name
- Calochortus pringlei B.L.Rob.

= Calochortus pringlei =

Species of flowering plant

Calochortus pringlei is a bulbous plant of the lily family. It is sometimes known by the common name Pringle's cyclobothra and belongs to subsection Ghiesbreghtiani within section Cyclobothra in the genus Calochortus. It occurs in mountainous south-central Mexico.

== Description ==
Calochortus pringlei is a bulbous perennial herb with deep red bell-shaped flowers. Its inflorescence is glaucous and sometimes branched, reaching a height of 20–40 cm. The flowers are campanulate and upright. The upper surface of the deep maroon petals is covered in long, tangled hairs that may be yellow, red, or violet. The nectary gland on the petals is crescent-shaped. The upper margins are jagged or fimbriate, and the undersides are glaucous. The sepals are shorter than the petals and are also purple-red above and glaucous below. The pinkish-brown anthers are oblong and pointed at the tips. Blooming occurs from August to September. The fruiting capsules are held erect and are trilocular.

Like other members of section Cyclobothra, C. pringlei forms bulb coats that are thick and coarsely hairy, appearing like a fibrous net. It also lacks bulbils in its leaf axils, which is characteristic of members of subsection Ghiesbreghtiani.

== Distribution and habitat ==
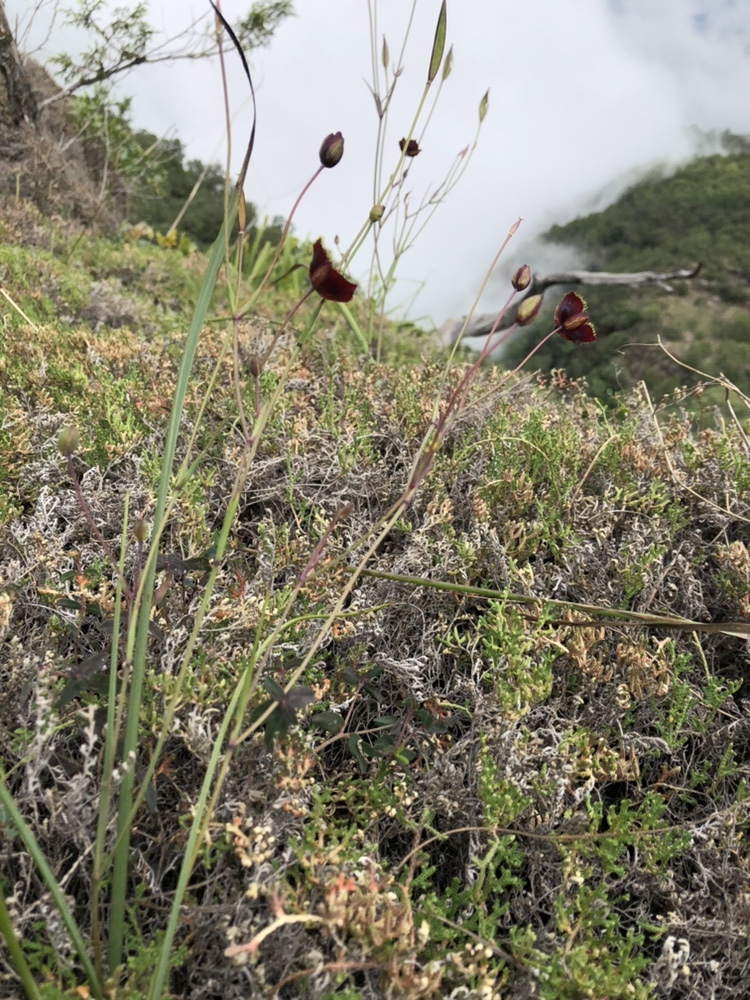
in situ C. pringlei in montane habitat

Calochortus pringlei occurs in the Mexican states Morelos and Puebla, as well as possibly Jalisco. It occurs in mountainous habitats at elevations of 2100–2400m. It experiences rain in the summer and cool, dry weather in the winter.

== Taxonomy and naming ==
Calochortus pringlei was first collected by Cyrus Guernsey Pringle on 15 September 1900, who discovered it growing in thin soil on Sierra de Tepoztlan in Morelos at an elevation of 2300 m. The type specimen, which was placed in the Gray Herbarium at Harvard, was described in 1901 by Benjamin Lincoln Robinson, then curator of the herbarium, as C. pringlei in honor of its collector.

In the 1940 treatise A Monograph of the Genus Calochortus, Marion Ownbey described the species as having nodding flowers based on herbarium specimens and placed C. pringlei in subsection Barbati. However, Frank Callahan and Hugh McDonald, having seen live specimens, revised the placement of this species and transferred it to subsection Ghiesbreghtiani on account of its gland characteristics and upright flowers.

== Cultivation ==
Calochortus pringlei is intolerant of frost but grows well in mild climates. If grown in areas with frost in winter, its bulbs should be lifted in the fall, meaning they should be taken out of the ground and left to dry over the winter.
