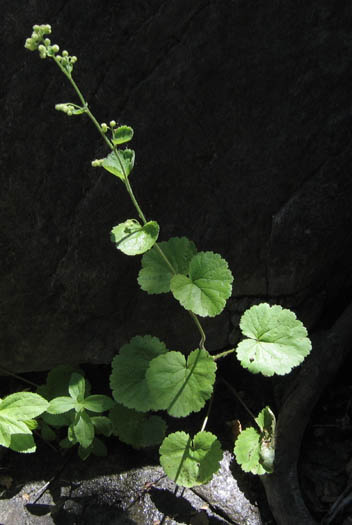

Conservation status
- Vulnerable (NatureServe)

Scientific classification
- Kingdom: Plantae
- Clade: Tracheophytes
- Clade: Angiosperms
- Clade: Eudicots
- Order: Saxifragales
- Family: Saxifragaceae
- Genus: Boykinia
- Species: B. rotundifolia

Binomial name
- Boykinia rotundifolia Parry

= Boykinia rotundifolia =

Species of flowering plant

Boykinia rotundifolia is an uncommon species of flowering plant in the saxifrage family known by the common name roundleafed brookfoam. It is endemic to Southern California, where it grows in shady forested areas near streams in the mountains.

== Description ==
Boykinia rotundifolia is a rhizomatous perennial herb producing leaves with blades up to 30 centimeters long, borne on petioles up to 18 centimeters in length. Each leaf has several rounded lobes with dull teeth along the edges.

The inflorescence reaches up to a meter (3 ft.) tall on a thin stem. It bears a dense array of many small white flowers, each with five tiny pointed sepals and five larger oval petals.
