= Boykinia intermedia =

Scientific classification
- Kingdom: Plantae
- Clade: Tracheophytes
- Clade: Angiosperms
- Clade: Eudicots
- Order: Saxifragales
- Family: Saxifragaceae
- Genus: Boykinia
- Species: B. intermedia

Binomial name
- Boykinia intermedia (Piper) G.N. Jones

Synonyms
- Boykinia major var. intermedia Piper; Therofon intermedium (Piper) A. Heller; Therofon major subsp. intermedium (Piper) Piper

Species of flowering plant

Boykinia intermedia is a plant species native to northwestern Oregon and Washington. Some publications reported the species from northern Idaho as well, but these citations appear to have been based in misidentified specimens. The species grows in forests, on stream banks and lake sides at elevations up to 700 m.

Boykinia intermedia is a perennial herb spreading by means of stolons running along the surface of the ground. Stems are up to 70 cm tall. Basal leaves are kidney-shaped, pinnately lobed, up to 11 cm long. Cauline (stem) leaves are up to 10 mm long. Flowers are white, borne in groups of up to 15 flowers.
