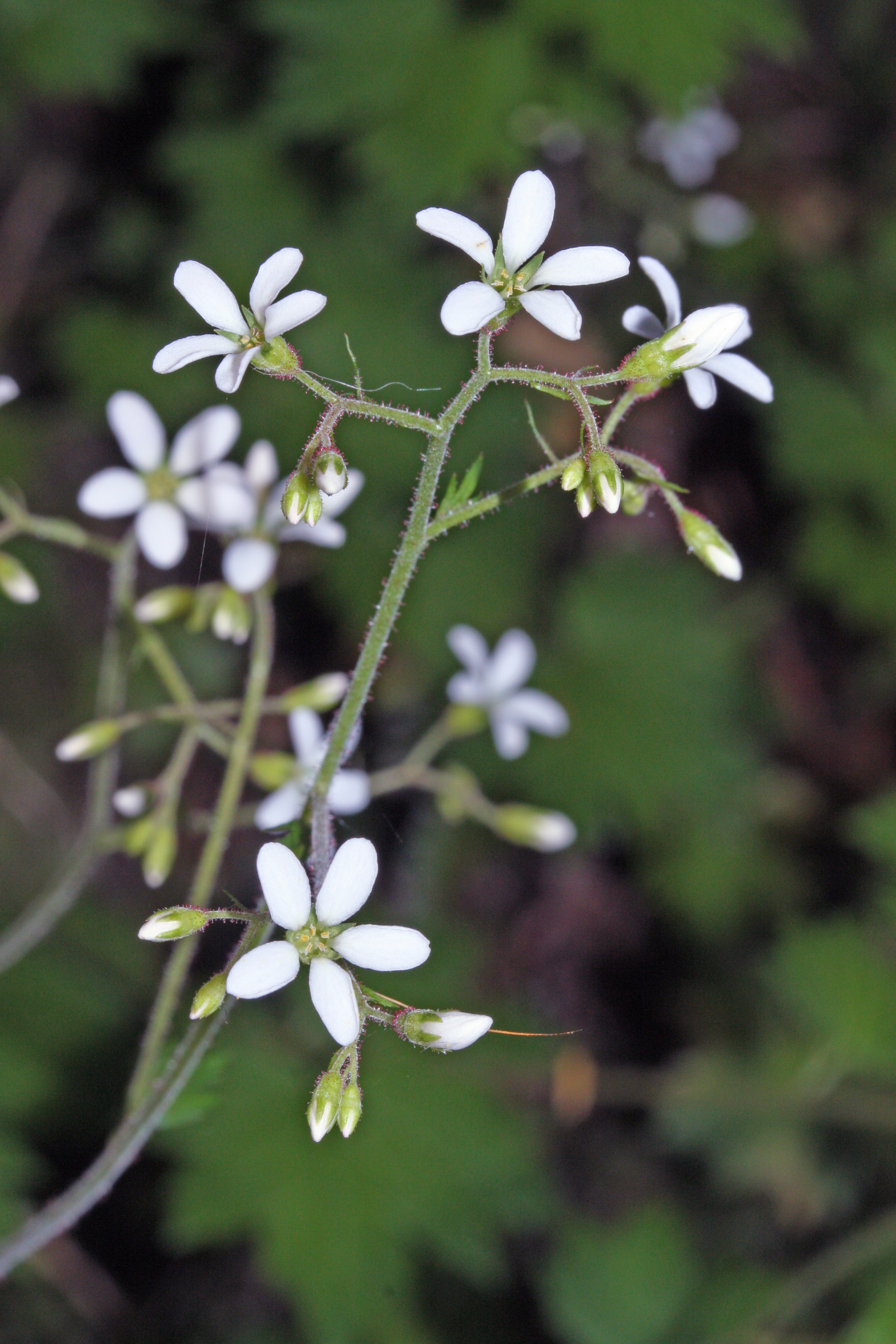
- Boykinia occidentalis

Scientific classification
- Kingdom: Plantae
- Clade: Embryophytes
- Clade: Tracheophytes
- Clade: Spermatophytes
- Clade: Angiosperms
- Clade: Eudicots
- Order: Saxifragales
- Family: Saxifragaceae
- Genus: Boykinia; Nutt. (1834)

Species
- 7; see text

Synonyms
- Neoboykinia H.Hara (1937); Therofon Raf. (1838), nom. superfl.

= Boykinia =

Genus of flowering plants

Boykinia is a small genus of plants related to the saxifrages. It contains at least nine species, known as brookfoams. Brookfoams are glandular rhizomatous creeping perennials with highly lobed or toothed leaves and inflorescences of petite flowers. They are native to North America (the west coast from Alaska to Baja California and the southeastern United States) and Asia (Japan).

== Species ==
Seven species are accepted.

- Boykinia aconitifolia Nutt. (type) – Allegheny brookfoam
- Boykinia intermedia (A.Heller) G.N.Jones – Sierra brookfoam
- Boykinia lycoctonifolia (Maxim.) Engl. – Japan (Hokkaido and northern and central Honshu)
- Boykinia major A.Gray – large boykinia
- Boykinia occidentalis Torr. & A.Gray – coastal brookfoam
- Boykinia richardsonii (Hook.) A.Gray ex B.D.Jacks. – Richardson's brookfoam
- Boykinia rotundifolia Parry ex A.Gray – roundleaf brookfoam
