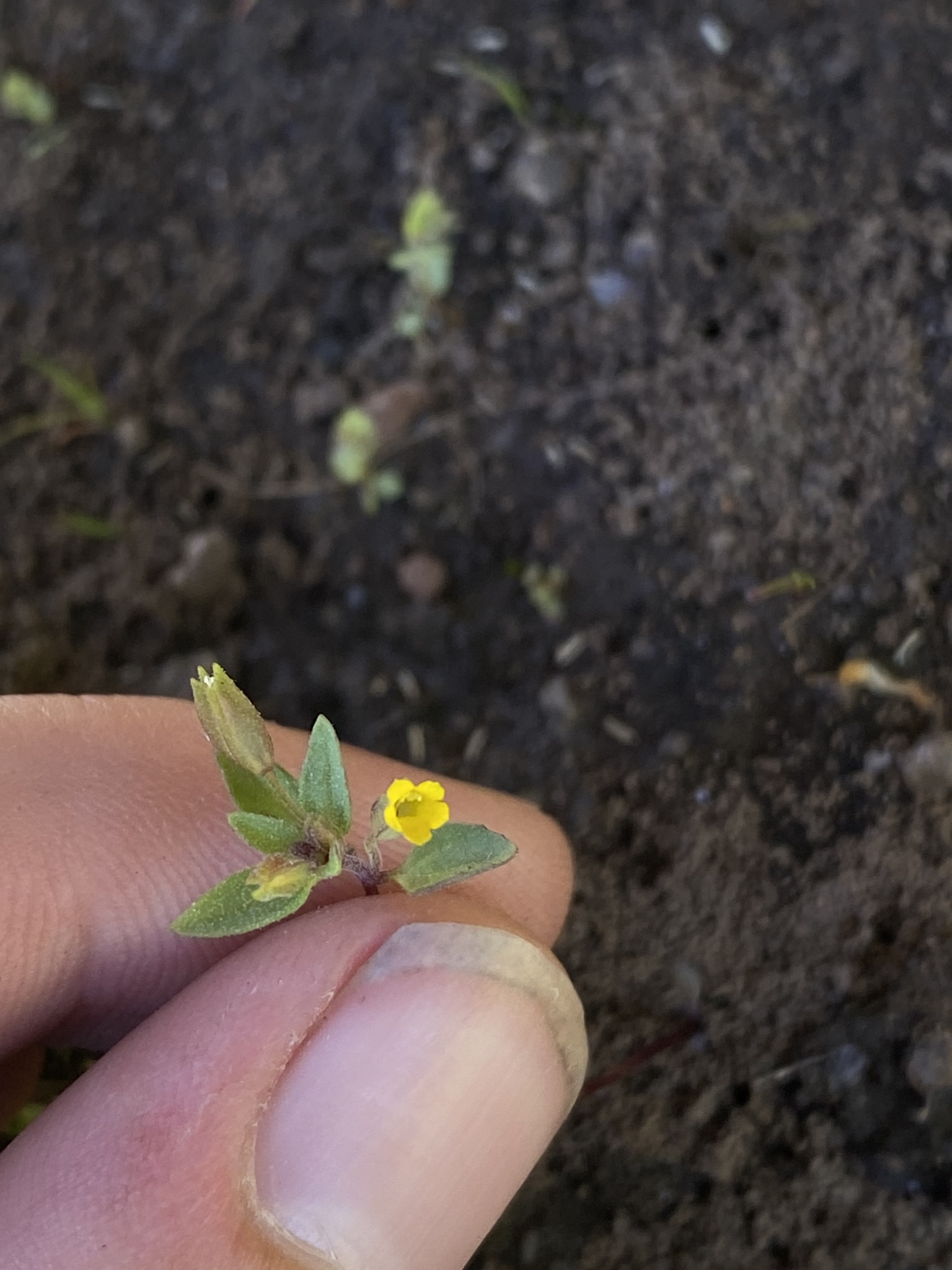
- Malheur National Forest, Oregon, 2023

Conservation status
- Apparently Secure (NatureServe)

Scientific classification
- Kingdom: Plantae
- Clade: Embryophytes
- Clade: Tracheophytes
- Clade: Angiosperms
- Clade: Eudicots
- Clade: Asterids
- Order: Lamiales
- Family: Phrymaceae
- Genus: Erythranthe
- Species: E. breviflora

Binomial name
- Erythranthe breviflora (Piper) G.L.Nesom

Synonyms
- Mimulus breviflorus Piper

= Erythranthe breviflora =

Species of flowering plant

Erythranthe breviflora is a species of monkeyflower known by the common name shortflower monkeyflower. It is native to western North America from British Columbia to Wyoming to the Modoc Plateau and northern Sierra Nevada in California. It grows in moist areas in several types of habitat. It was formerly known as Mimulus breviflorus.

== Description ==
Erythranthe breviflora is a lightly hairy annual herb producing a thin, erect stem up to 17 centimeters tall. The paired leaves have oval-shaped blades borne on petioles, each with a total length under 3 centimeters. The tiny tubular yellow flower is a few millimeters long. Its corolla is divided into five lobes at the mouth.
