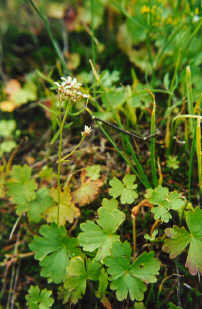
- Suksdorfia ranunculifolia

Scientific classification
- Kingdom: Plantae
- Clade: Embryophytes
- Clade: Tracheophytes
- Clade: Spermatophytes
- Clade: Angiosperms
- Clade: Eudicots
- Order: Saxifragales
- Family: Saxifragaceae
- Genus: Suksdorfia; A.Gray (1880), nom. cons.

Species
- Suksdorfia alchemilloides (Griseb.) Engl.; Suksdorfia violacea A.Gray

Synonyms
- Hieronymusia Engl. (1918)

= Suksdorfia =

Genus of flowering plants

Suksdorfia is a genus in the family Saxifragaceae. It has only two accepted species, Suksdorfia alchemilloides and Suksdorfia violacea, native to central South America and northwestern North America, respectively. Asa Gray named the genus Suksdorfia after Wilhelm Nikolaus Suksdorf, a mostly self-taught German botanist who came to the United States at age eight and found the species S. violacea in the northwestern United States. S. violacea is the type species for this genus.

Since the International Rules of Botanical Nomenclature of 1906, the genus name Suksdorfia Gray, published in 1879, has been conserved against the earlier name Hemieva Raf., which had been published in 1837 with the type species Hemieva ranunculifolia (Hook.) Raf. (based on Saxifraga ranunculifolia Hook., published in 1832).
