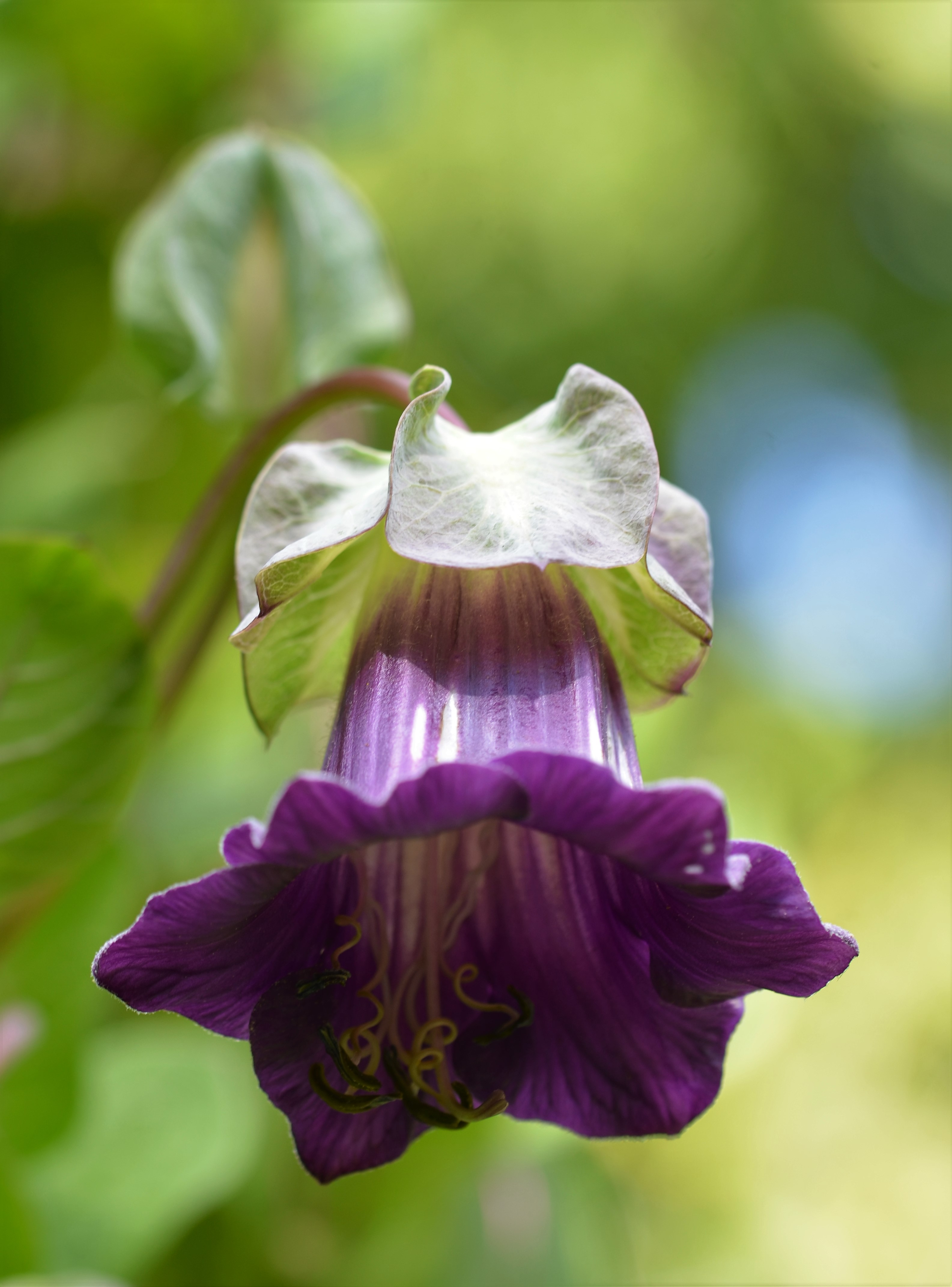

Scientific classification
- Kingdom: Plantae
- Clade: Embryophytes
- Clade: Tracheophytes
- Clade: Angiosperms
- Clade: Eudicots
- Clade: Asterids
- Order: Ericales
- Family: Polemoniaceae
- Genus: Cobaea
- Species: C. scandens

Binomial name
- Cobaea scandens Cav.

= Cobaea scandens =

Species of vine

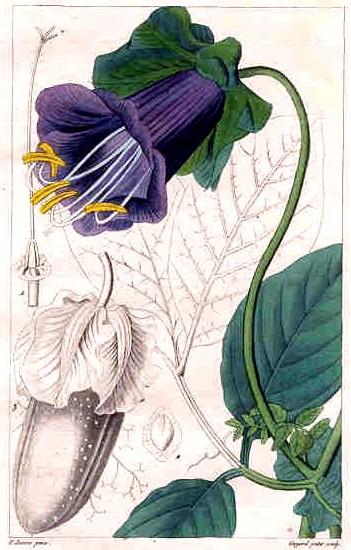
Cobaea scandens by Pancrace Bessa

Cobaea scandens, the cup-and-saucer vine, cathedral bells, Mexican ivy, or monastery bells, is a species of flowering plant in the phlox family Polemoniaceae. It is native to Mexico, with isolated sightings elsewhere in tropical central and South America.

== Description ==
It is a self-clinging perennial climber. The Latin specific epithet scandens means 'climbing'. The 10 cm (4 in) leaves comprise four leaflets and a tendril furnished with small hooks for clinging on to a support. The large forward-facing flowers open white, but become violet as they mature. They are pollinated by bats in their native habitat, are bell-shaped with a pronounced ruff – hence the name cup-and-saucer. Mature flowers are scented. Present a capsular fruits with seeds.

== Cultivation ==
It is widely cultivated for its twining habit and its highly ornamental flowers, 5 cm (2 in) long, which change from white to purple. In temperate regions it is best grown as a half-hardy annual, sown in heat under glass in early spring, and planted out after all danger of frost is past. It has gained the Royal Horticultural Society's Award of Garden Merit (confirmed 2017). A white form exists, C. scandens f. alba.

== Darwin's observations ==
Charles Darwin in 1875 made a detailed study of various climbing and twining plants, subjecting them to stimuli such as light and touch, and presenting them with a range of surfaces while minutely examining their movement over time. He was impressed by the exceptional strength and speed of Cobaea scandens:

This is an excellently constructed climber. The tendrils on a fine plant were eleven inches long, with the petiole bearing two pairs of leaflets, only two and a half inches in length. They revolve more rapidly and vigorously than those of any other tendril-bearer observed by me, with the exception of one kind of Passiflora.

...

The long, straight, tapering main stem of the tendril of the Cobaea bears alternate branches; and each branch is several times divided, with the finer branches as thin as very thin bristles and extremely flexible, so that they are blown about by a breath of air; yet they are strong and highly elastic. The extremity of each branch is a little flattened, and terminates in a minute double (though sometimes single) hook, formed of a hard, translucent, woody substance, and as sharp as the finest needle. On a tendril which was eleven inches long I counted ninety-four of these beautifully constructed little hooks. They readily catch soft wood, or gloves, or the skin of the naked hand. With the exception of these hardened hooks, and of the basal part of the central stem, every part of every branchlet is highly sensitive on all sides to a slight touch, and bends in a few minutes towards the touched side. By lightly rubbing several sub-branches on opposite sides, the whole tendril rapidly assumed an extraordinarily crooked shape. These movements from contact do not interfere with the ordinary revolving movement. The branches, after becoming greatly curved from being touched, straighten themselves at a quicker rate than in almost any other tendril seen by me, namely, in between half an hour and an hour.
