= Cyrus Pringle =

American botanist (1838-1911)

Cyrus Guernsey Pringle
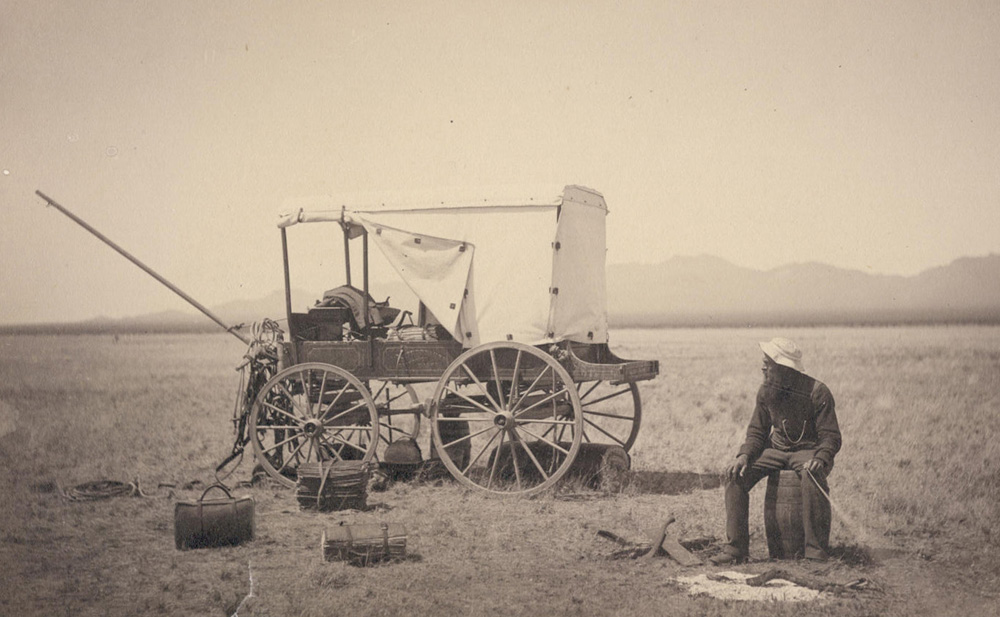
- Pringle's self-portrait in Arizona, 1884
- Born: May 6, 1838; Charlotte, Vermont, United States
- Died: May 25, 1911 (aged 73)
- Resting place: Morningside Cemetery, East Charlotte, Vermont, United States
- Other name: Cyrus Guernsey Prindle
- Scientific career
- Fields: Botany
- Workplaces: American Museum of Natural History; United States Census Bureau; Smithsonian Institution
- Author abbrev. (botany): Pringle

Cyrus Guernsey Pringle (May 6, 1838 – May 25, 1911) was an American plant breeder and botanist who spent a career of 35 years cataloguing the plants of North America. He was a prolific collector and accomplished botanical explorer. The standard author abbreviation Pringle is used to indicate this person as the author when citing a botanical name.

== Early life ==
He was born on May 6, 1838, in Charlotte, Vermont, to George and Louisa (Harris) Pringle. He studied in Hinesburg and Bakersfield, Vermont, and later at Stanbridge, Quebec, before entering the University of Vermont in 1859. However, the death of his older brother during the first semester made it necessary for him to aid his widowed mother in the management of the farm and to withdraw from college. Later, however, he would be awarded an honorary Sc.D. from the University of Vermont as well as an honorary M.A. from Middlebury College.

In the early part of his life he was interested in the Quaker religious doctrine of the Friends, and it was through these meetings that he met Almira Lydia Greene of Starksboro, Vermont. Pringle became a Quaker in order to be with Almira, eventually marrying on February 25, 1863.

His first horticultural undertakings were on his mother's farm in 1857, when, at the age of nineteen, he budded a small seedling apple tree with a large, striped, sweet summer apple. In 1858 he started his first nursery, containing a small pear orchard, fruit yards, gardens of currants, cherries, grapes, peaches and potatoes. He made a plan for each orchard or garden, giving the name and location of each plant. By crossbreeding, he obtained a new potato variety which he called 'Snowflake'. This potato was introduced to the public in New York. Robert Fenn, an Englishman much interested in crossing American and English varieties of potatoes, recognized Pringle's ability and the two of them worked together on other projects, such as the crossing of 'Snowflake' with 'Rector of Woodstock' and vice versa. Another cross-bred potato of 1870, 'Ruby', gained a first-class certificate from the London Horticultural Society, and, with 'Snowflake', was awarded a silver medal by the Massachusetts Horticultural Society.

Pringle grew and sold seedlings of Gladiolus, wheat, more than 100 varieties of irises, and nearly all the species of lilies known at the time. His Hubbard squash seeds brought a dollar a pound at one time. He also ran a "hospital" for bulbs, to which people would send their sick specimens for rehabilitation.

== Civil War ==
During the American Civil War, about five months after his marriage, Pringle was drafted into the Union Army on July 13, 1863, along with two other Vermont Quakers following the Confederate Conscription Acts 1862–1864. They shared the Quakers' disapproval of war, and when Pringle's uncle offered to pay the US$300 (equivalent to $7,845 in 2025) necessary for his release, he would not allow this to be done, regarding that solution as a selfish compromise with principle. Refusing to perform all military duty, he was subjected to severe discipline. The Quakers were kept for days in the guardhouse in company with drunks and criminals. On October 3, 1863, at Culpeper, Virginia, Pringle was staked to the ground, with his arms outstretched and his legs rackedracked; he was left in this position for hours, until "so weak he could hardly walk or perform any exertion." He was also threatened with death if he would not give up, but his only reply was, "It can but give me pain to be asked or required to do anything I believe to be wrong." After a day of extreme pain he wrote in his diary, "This has been the happiest day of my life, to be privileged to fight the battle for universal peace."

When Secretary of War Edwin Stanton heard of this treatment, he ordered "the three incorrigibles" be sent to Washington, D.C. Isaac Newton, Commissioner of Agriculture, went to President Abraham Lincoln about their case, who subsequently asked the Secretary to release them. Stanton refused, claiming that his oath of office stood in the way of discharging them from military service. It was only after President Lincoln had gone personally to Stanton that the parole was granted.

== Career ==
Pringle once again turned his energies to plant breeding in 1868, attempting to hybridize new varieties of various fruits, corn, tomatoes, and grains such as wheat and oats. In 1872, Pringle's wife separated from him to pursue evangelistic work and they divorced on October 16, 1877.

Sometime in the 1870s, Pringle began to collect plants throughout Vermont, from deep in mossy woods, by lakesides, or high on mountain summits. On December 13, 1874, he was appointed to the Vermont Board of Agriculture. During three successive years he took boat trips up the lower St. Lawrence to the Saguenay Rivers in Canada, and the St. Francis and St. John Rivers of northern Maine. In 1878, he displayed many of the Vermont specimens which he had been collecting at the Paris World's Fair.

In 1880 he received three commissions: collecting wood samples for the Jesup Collection, under the auspices of the American Museum of Natural History; exploring American forests and collecting data for a final report for the United States Census Bureau, working for Charles Sprague Sargent; and general botanical collecting on behalf of Asa Gray. In 1884, he made a botanical survey of the northern portions of Arizona, under the auspices of the Smithsonian Institution. Pringle was appointed to the Gray Herbarium as a botanical collector in 1885, eventually making 39 expeditions to Mexico over the next 24 years.

In April 1896, he was elected a member of the newly established New England Botanical Club and attended the meetings when in Boston. He was a charter member and later vice-president of the Vermont Botanical Club.

During his 35 years of field work in the United States, Canada and Mexico, Pringle collected over 500,000 specimens which included some 1,200 species new to science. Duplicates of his own collections were distributed widely and can be found throughout many herbaria in the United States and abroad. Pringle issued more than 20 exsiccata-like series, the first of them with the title Plantae Mexicanae 1885.

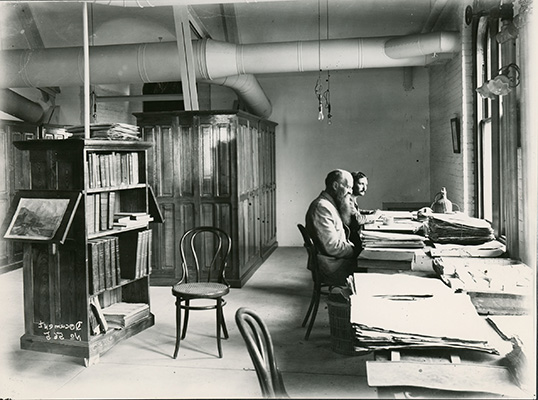
Cyrus Guernsey Pringle and his assistant Filemón L. Lozano at the University of Vermont, 1911

From the early 1900s Pringle was assisted in his botanical work by Filemón Lozano y Lozano. Lozano rarely appears alongside Pringle as a co-collector on specimen labels.

== Death ==
In the last year of his life Pringle was planning a trip to South America, but became ill. He died on May 25, 1911, and is buried in Morningside Cemetery, East Charlotte, Vermont.

== Legacy ==
Pringle is the namesake of the Pringle Herbarium at the University of Vermont.

Several genera were named in honor of Pringle, including Neopringlea (Salicaceae), Pringleella (Ditrichaceae), Pringleochloa (a synonym of Bouteloua Lag.), and Pringleophytum (synonym of Holographis Nees). Likewise, the species Calochortus pringlei, Clethra pringlei, Cobaea pringlei, Eryngium pringlei, Lupinus pringlei, Pinus pringlei, Rosa pringlei, and Pachycereus pringlei were all named after him.

== Publications ==
Pringle wrote many articles in The Country Gentleman from 1869 to 1880, including "Origin of the Snowflake Potato" in 1880. In 1884 he published "Pringle's Reports on Forests of Vermont, New Hampshire, New York, Pennsylvania and West Virginia," a section in the Report on the Forests of North America (exclusive of Mexico).

Pringle documented his experience during the Civil War in his diary. The Record of a Quaker Conscience: Cyrus Pringle's Diary was published posthumously in 1918 with an introduction by Rufus Jones.

== See also ==
- Draft evasion
- History of the Quakers
