= Stemmatophalera sjostedti =

Scientific classification
- Kingdom: Animalia
- Phylum: Arthropoda
- Clade: Pancrustacea
- Class: Insecta
- Order: Lepidoptera
- Superfamily: Noctuoidea
- Family: Notodontidae
- Genus: Stemmatophalera
- Species: S. sjostedti

Binomial name
- Stemmatophalera sjostedti Aurivillius, 1910

Species of moth

Stemmatophalera sjostedti is a species of moth in the family Notodontidae. It was described by Per Olof Christopher Aurivillius in 1910. This species has been documented in most of southern Africa. Known host plants include Chaetachme aristata, Croton sylvaticus, Grewia lasiocarpa, and Trema orientalis.
