= Stemmatophalera persimilis =

Scientific classification
- Kingdom: Animalia
- Phylum: Arthropoda
- Clade: Pancrustacea
- Class: Insecta
- Order: Lepidoptera
- Superfamily: Noctuoidea
- Family: Notodontidae
- Genus: Stemmatophalera
- Species: S. persimilis

Binomial name
- Stemmatophalera persimilis Hampson, 1910

Species of moth

Stemmatophalera persimilis is a species of moth in the family Notodontidae. It was originally described in the genus Disracha by Sir George Francis Hampson, 10th Baronet, in 1910, and was transferred to the genus Stemmatophalera in 2015 by Schintlmeister & T. Witt. It is found in most of Sub-Saharan Africa. Known host plants include Chaetachme aristata, Croton sylvaticus, Grewia lasiocarpa, and Trema bracteolata.
