= Native peach =

Native peach may refer to flowering plants not in the rose family (Rosaceae), which includes actual peaches:

- Santalum acuminatum, also known as desert quandong
- Trema tomentosa var. viridus, also known as peach-leaved poison bush
