= Nalita =

Nalita may refer to:

- Trema orientalis, a flowering tree in the hemp family
- Mulukhiya, leaves of the jute plant used as a vegetable
