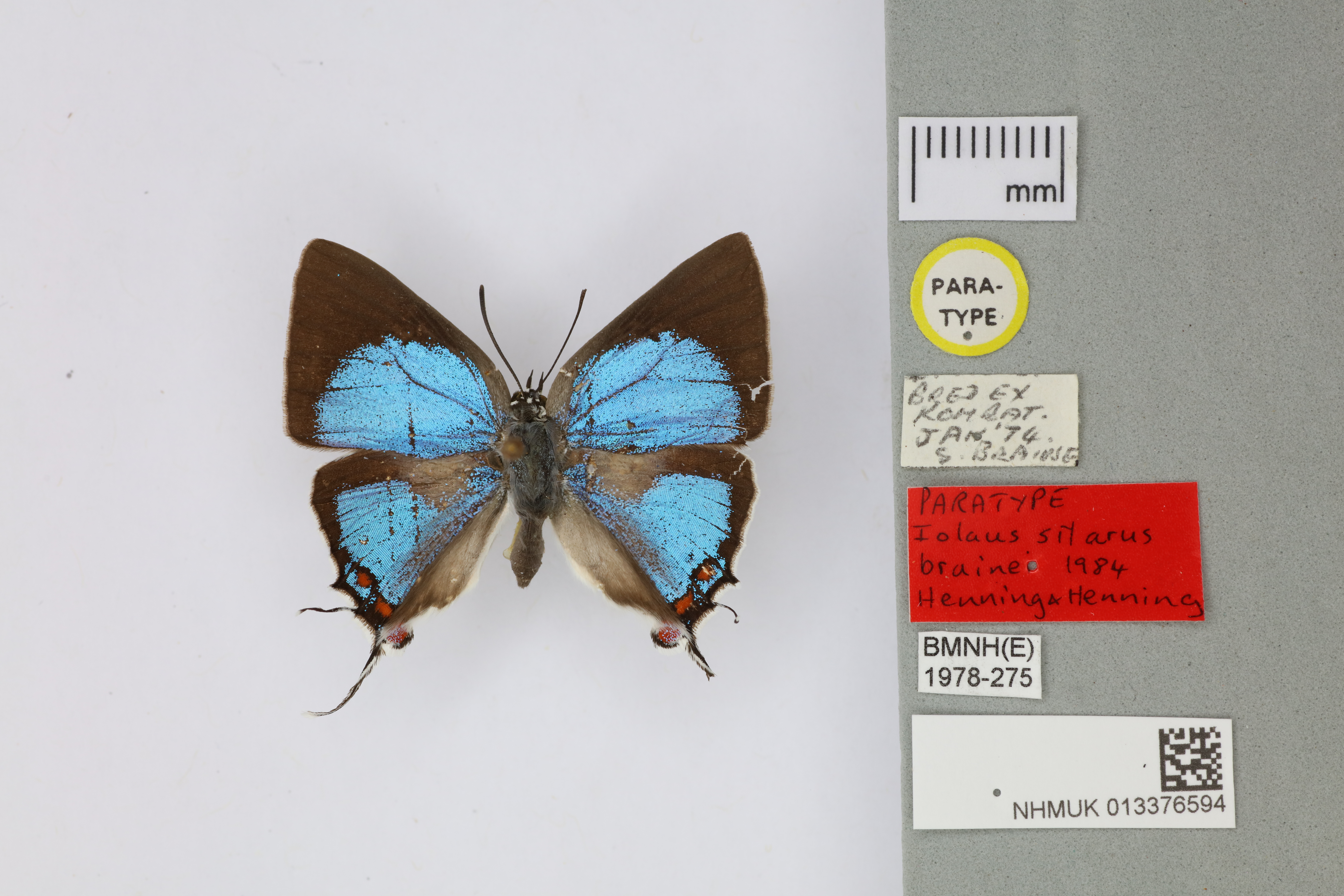
- Iolaus silarus

Scientific classification
- Kingdom: Animalia
- Phylum: Arthropoda
- Class: Insecta
- Order: Lepidoptera
- Family: Lycaenidae
- Genus: Iolaus
- Species: I. silarus

Binomial name
- Iolaus silarus H. H. Druce, 1885

Synonyms
- Jolaus silas lasius Suffert, 1904

= Iolaus silarus =

Species of butterfly

Iolaus silarus, the straight-line sapphire, is a butterfly of the family Lycaenidae. The species was first described by Hamilton Herbert Druce in 1885. It is found in Mozambique, Zimbabwe, Botswana, Namibia, Malawi, Zambia, southern Zaire, Tanzania, south-western Kenya and South Africa. In South Africa it is found in wooded savannah in northern KwaZulu-Natal and in savannah from Eswatini to Mpumalanga, Limpopo and North West. It is also present in Afromontane forest on the Wolkberg and the northern Drakensberg.

The wingspan is 32–38 mm for males and 35–40 mm for females. Adults are on wing year round in warmer areas and from September to January in the cooler western part of its range.

The larvae feed on Erianthemum dregei.

== Subspecies ==
- Iolaus silarus silarus (Eswatini, Mozambique, Zimbabwe, Botswana, Malawi, Zambia, Democratic Republic of the Congo: Shaba, Tanzania, southern Kenya, South Africa: Limpopo Province, Mpumalanga, North West Province, KwaZulu-Natal)
- Iolaus silarus brainei Henning & Henning, 1984 (northern Namibia)
