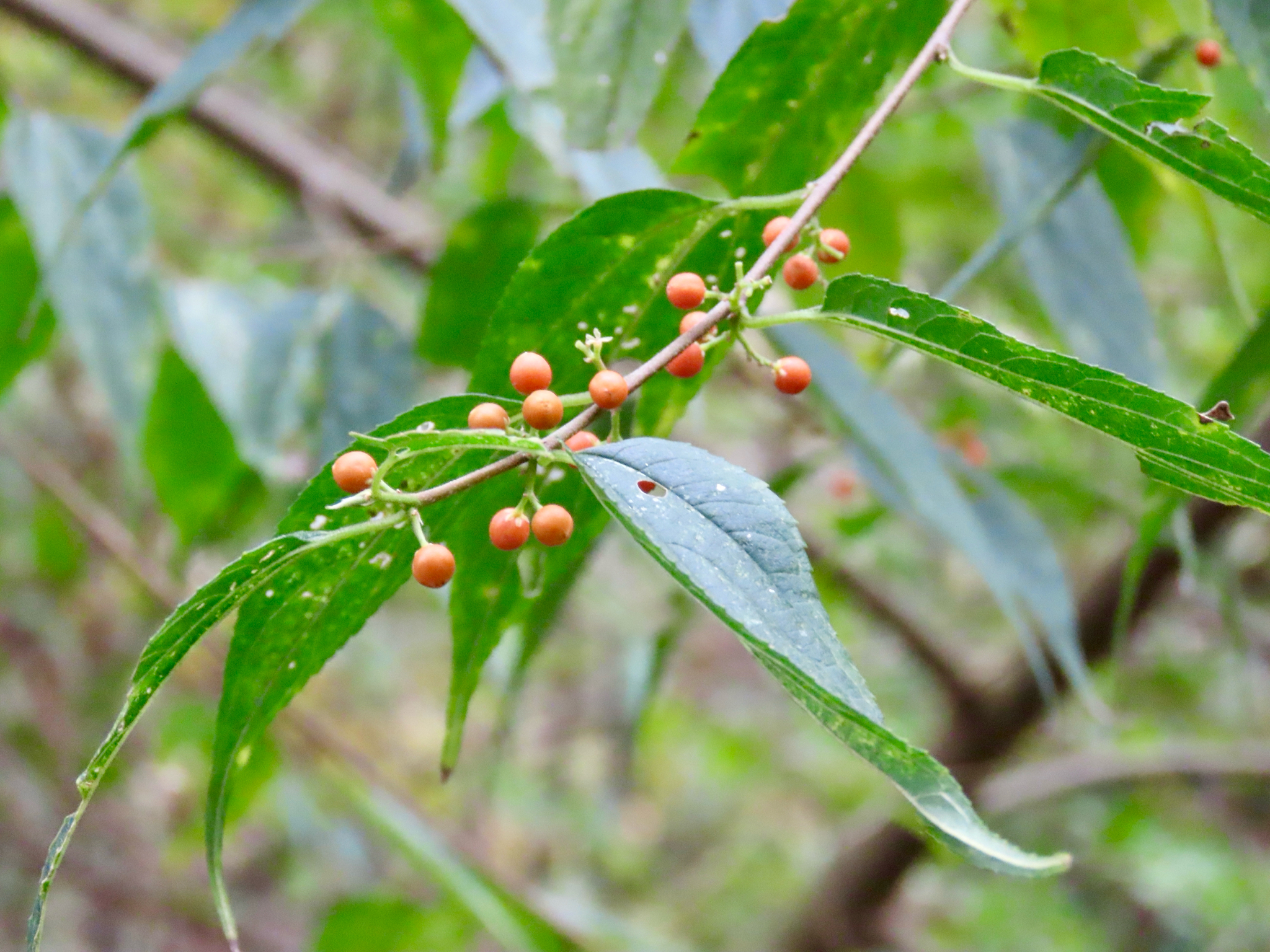
- With fruit

Conservation status
- Least Concern (IUCN 3.1)

Scientific classification
- Kingdom: Plantae
- Clade: Embryophytes
- Clade: Tracheophytes
- Clade: Angiosperms
- Clade: Eudicots
- Clade: Rosids
- Order: Rosales
- Family: Cannabaceae
- Genus: Trema
- Species: T. cannabina

Binomial name
- Trema cannabina Lour.

Synonyms
- 32 synonyms: for var. cannabina; Celtis microphylla Zipp. ex Blume; Celtis rostrata Zipp. ex Span.; Celtis virgata Roxb.; Sponia carinata (Blume) Miq.; Sponia glabrescens Planch.; Sponia morifolia Planch.; Sponia pallida (Blume) Miq.; Sponia peruviana Klotzsch; Sponia pubigera (Blume) Miq.; Sponia rostrata Span.; Sponia timorensis Decne.; Sponia vieillardii Planch.; Sponia virgata Planch.; Sponia virgata var. major Planch.; Trema cannabina var. glabrescens (Planch.) de Wit; Trema cannabina var. scabrum (Blume) de Wit; Trema carinatum Blume; Trema glabrescens (Planch.) Blume; Trema morifolium (Planch.) Blume; Trema orientale var. viride Lauterb.; Trema pallidum Blume; Trema pubigerum Blume; Trema timorense (Decne.) Blume; Trema timorense var. carinatum (Blume) Lauterb.; Trema timorense var. pallidum (Blume) Lauterb.; Trema timorense var. procerum Blume; Trema vieillardii (Planch.) Schltr.; Trema virgatum (Planch.) Blume; Trema virgatum var. pubigerum (Blume) Lauterb.; Trema virgatum var. scabrum Blume; for var. dielsianum; Trema dielsianum Hand.-Mazz.; Trema calcicola S.X.Ren

= Trema cannabina =

Species of flowering plant

Trema cannabina is a species of flowering plant in the family Cannabaceae, native to regions from India to the western Pacific. It is commonly known as lesser trema and poison peach, and as mãgele in Samoa.

== Description ==
Trema cannabina is a small tree growing to around 6 m (20 ft) tall, with a trunk diameter of up to 30 cm (12 in). The bark is smooth and emits an unpleasant odour when cut. The leaves are ovate, that is, broad at the base and narrowing to a point at the tip. They grow up to 16 cm (6 in) long and 6 cm (2.4 in) wide. The inflorescences are up to 2.5 cm (1 in) long; the white flowers quite small, with tepals measuring about 1.5 mm (0.06 in) long. Fruits are red/brown drupes about 3 mm (0.12 in) diameter.

== Distribution and habitat ==
It grows in well-lit positions in lowland and upland forests, and is favoured by disturbance. It can be found from sea level to an altitude of around 1,100 m (3,600 ft).

It occurs from Nepal and India, through mainland Asia to Japan, south through Indonesia and the Philippines to northern Australia and to islands of the western Pacific.

== Infraspecies ==
As of January 2026, Plants of the World Online accepts two varieties:

- T. cannabina var. cannabina
- T. cannabina var. dielsianum (Hand.-Mazz.) C.J.Chen

== Uses ==
Fibre from this plant is used to make paper and rope, while soap and lubricants are made from the seed oil.
