= Stemmatophalera io =

Scientific classification
- Kingdom: Animalia
- Phylum: Arthropoda
- Clade: Pancrustacea
- Class: Insecta
- Order: Lepidoptera
- Superfamily: Noctuoidea
- Family: Notodontidae
- Genus: Stemmatophalera
- Species: S. io

Binomial name
- Stemmatophalera io Viette, 1954

Species of moth

Stemmatophalera io is a species of moth in the family Notodontidae. It was originally described in the genus Acrasiodes by Pierre Viette in 1954, and was transferred to the genus Stemmatophalera in 2015 by Schintlmeister & T. Witt. It is found in Madagascar.
