= Stemmatophalera =

Scientific classification
- Kingdom: Animalia
- Phylum: Arthropoda
- Clade: Pancrustacea
- Class: Insecta
- Order: Lepidoptera
- Superfamily: Noctuoidea
- Family: Notodontidae
- Subfamily: Notodontinae
- Genus: Stemmatophalera; Aurivillius, 1910

Genus of moths

Stemmatophalera is a moth genus in the family Notodontidae erected by Per Olof Christopher Aurivillius in 1910.

The genus includes six species:

- Stemmatophalera curvilinea (Swinhoe, 1907)
- Stemmatophalera hypochlora (Kiriakoff, 1960)
- Stemmatophalera io (Viette, 1954)
- Stemmatophalera persimilis (Hampson, 1910)
- Stemmatophalera sjostedti (Aurivillius, 1910)
- Stemmatophalera synceros (Kiriakoff, 1962)
