= Trema discolor =

Conservation status
- Vulnerable (IUCN 3.1)

Scientific classification
- Kingdom: Plantae
- Clade: Embryophytes
- Clade: Tracheophytes
- Clade: Angiosperms
- Clade: Eudicots
- Clade: Rosids
- Order: Rosales
- Family: Cannabaceae
- Genus: Trema
- Species: T. discolor

Binomial name
- Trema discolor (Brongn.) Blume (1856)

Synonyms
- Celtis discolor Brongn. (1834); Sponia discolor (Brongn.) Decne. ex Planch. (1848); Sponia discolor f. lepinei Planch. (1873); Sponia discolor f. lessonii Planch. (1873)

Species of flowering plant

Trema discolor is a species of plant in the family Cannabaceae. It is endemic to French Polynesia. It is native to the Society Islands and to Raivavae in the Tubuai Islands.

== Status ==
It is listed as vulnerable by the IUCN.
