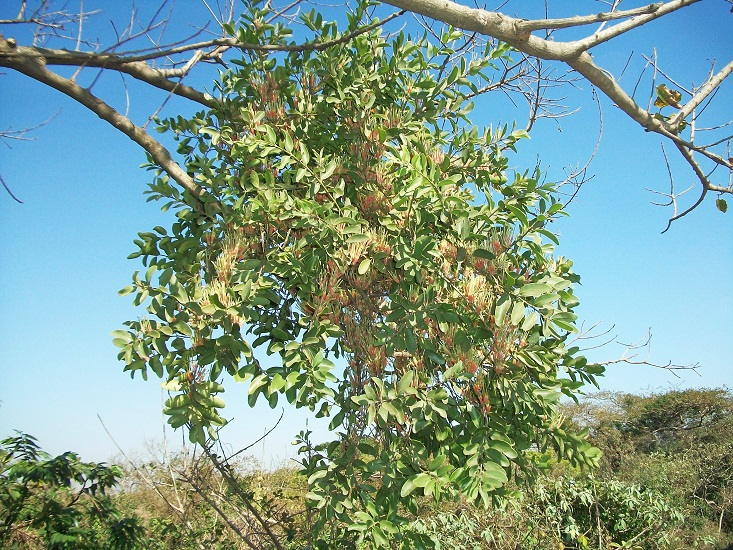
- E. dregei on a Croton sylvaticus host at Amanzimtoti, South Africa

Scientific classification
- Kingdom: Plantae
- Clade: Tracheophytes
- Clade: Angiosperms
- Clade: Eudicots
- Order: Santalales
- Family: Loranthaceae
- Genus: Erianthemum
- Species: E. dregei

Binomial name
- Erianthemum dregei (Eckl. & Zeyh.) Tiegh.

Synonyms
- Loranthus dregei Eckl. & Zeyh.; Loranthus heterochromus K.Krause; Loranthus hirsutiflorus Klotzsch; Loranthus linguiformis Peter; Loranthus oblongifolius E.Mey.; Loranthus roseus Klotzsch; Loranthus ulugurensis auct.

= Erianthemum dregei =

Hairy mistletoe

Species of mistletoe

Erianthemum dregei is a species of parasitic plant in the family Loranthaceae, and is commonly known as the hairy mistletoe or wood flower.

== Distribution and habitat ==
These plants are native to Africa and are parasitic on a large number of tree species in higher rainfall areas from the Eastern Cape of South Africa, through KwaZulu-Natal, Eswatini and Mpumalanga, to East Africa, as far as northern Ethiopia. They are also found in southern Angola.

== Description ==
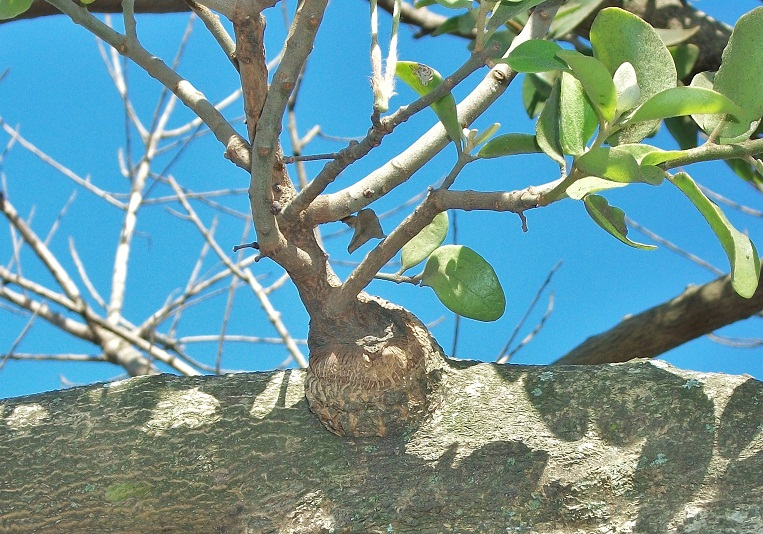
Stem of E. dregei growing out of the branch of Croton sylvaticus

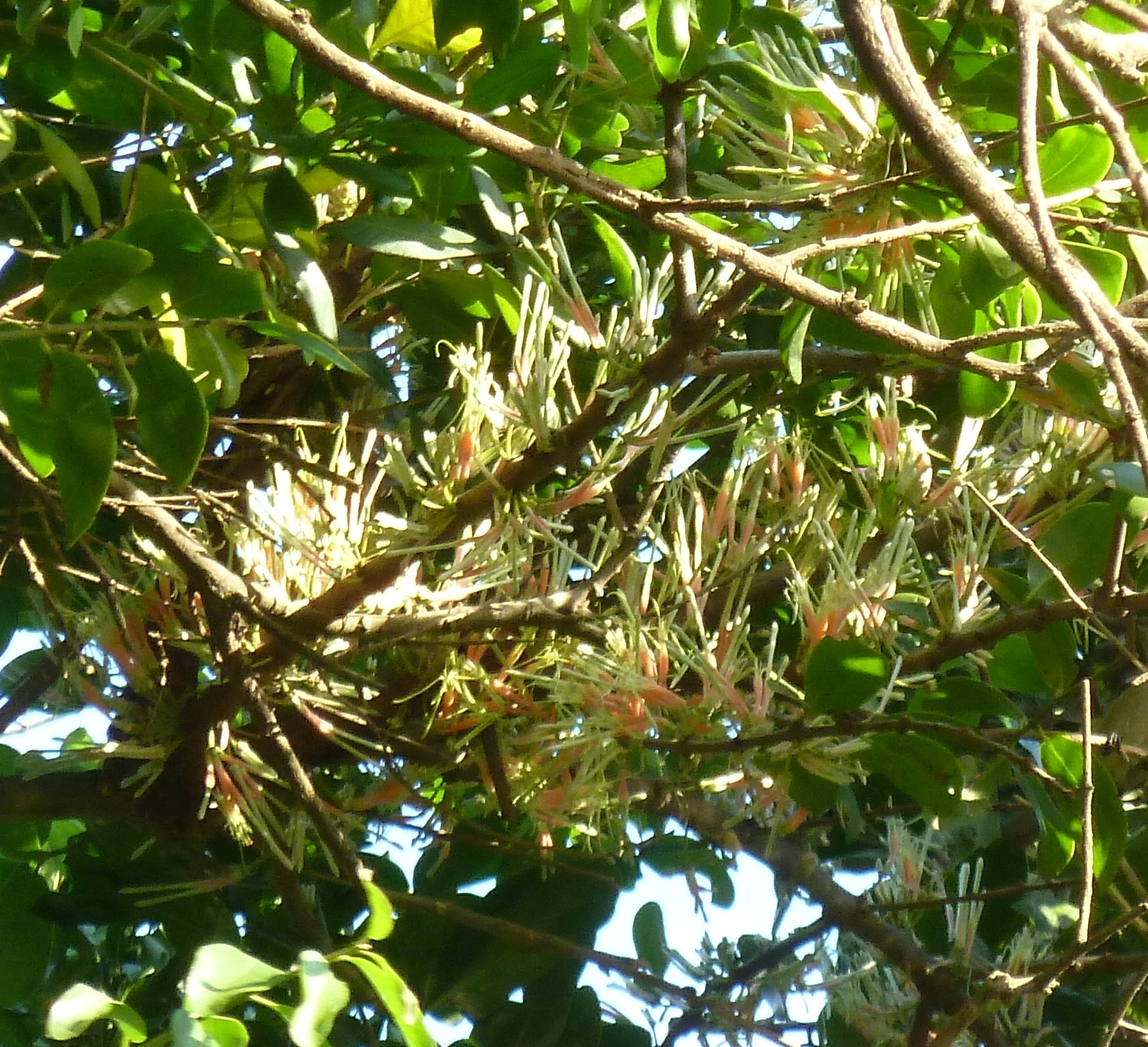
Flowers of E. dregei

A branched parasitic shrub with spreading or pendent stems, forming clumps of up to 2m x 1.5m. The leaves are leathery and hairless, usually alternate (sometimes opposite), with conspicuous side veins. The growing points are velvety brown. The flowers are massed in small clusters and are densely hairy, pale yellowish-green and sometimes flushed orange to pink. The fruit is an orange to bright red berry, 10–15 mm in size. Erianthemum dregei shows great variation across its range.

== Human uses ==
Erianthemum dregei is used in African traditional medicine to treat stomach complaints in children and cattle.

== Ecological significance ==
The flowers and fruit attract birds. The leaves are eaten by the larvae of Mylothris agathina.
