= Stemmatophalera curvilinea =

Scientific classification
- Kingdom: Animalia
- Phylum: Arthropoda
- Clade: Pancrustacea
- Class: Insecta
- Order: Lepidoptera
- Superfamily: Noctuoidea
- Family: Notodontidae
- Genus: Stemmatophalera
- Species: S. curvilinea

Binomial name
- Stemmatophalera curvilinea Swinhoe, 1907

Species of moth

Stemmatophalera curvilinea is a species of moth in the family Notodontidae. It was described by Charles Swinhoe in 1907. This species is widely distributed across Sub-Saharan Africa.
