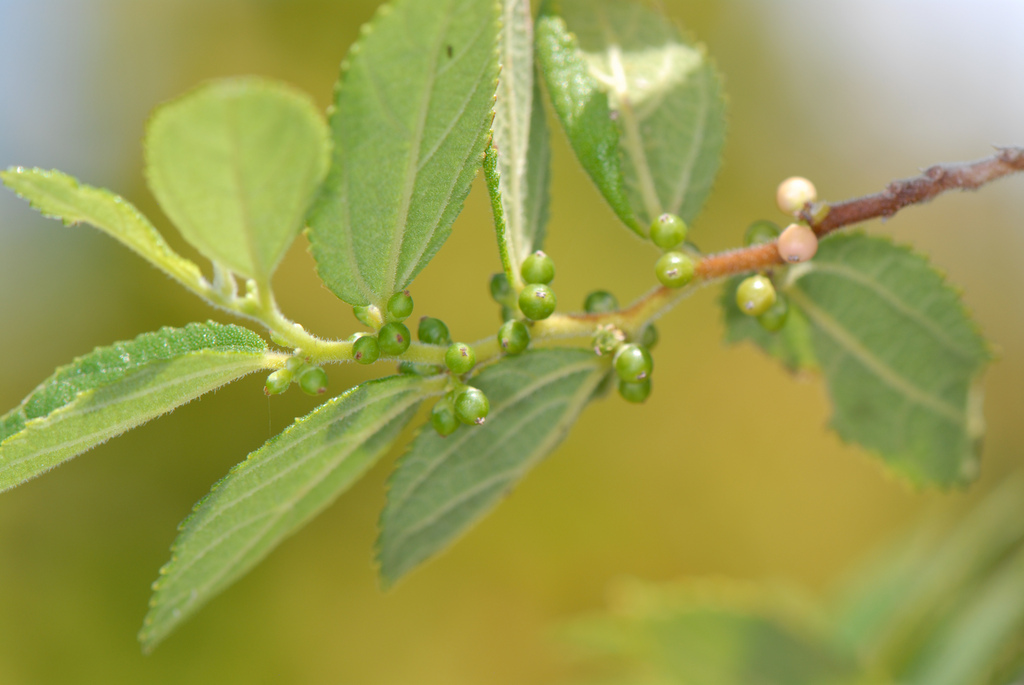
- West Indian nettle tree

Conservation status
- Least Concern (IUCN 3.1)

Scientific classification
- Kingdom: Plantae
- Clade: Tracheophytes
- Clade: Angiosperms
- Clade: Eudicots
- Clade: Rosids
- Order: Rosales
- Family: Cannabaceae
- Genus: Trema
- Species: T. lamarckianum

Binomial name
- Trema lamarckianum (Schult.) Blume

= Trema lamarckianum =

Species of tree

Trema lamarckianum, Lamarck's trema, West Indian nettle tree, or pain-in-the-back is a plant species in the genus Trema of the family Cannabaceae. It is a small evergreen shrub that is native of Florida and the West Indies. It has several common names such as pain-in-back, cabrilla and Lamarck trema. It is 6 m tall growing all year.

== Distribution ==
The native regions where Trema lamarckianum occurs include Florida in North America, West Indies, Bermuda, Grand Cayman and the Bahamas.

== Habitat and ecology ==
Trema lamarckianum is considered a pioneer species and can grow in a wide range of disturbed areas, even those whose ground is predominately sedimentary or igneous rocks. The areas in Puerto Rico where this species grows has an annual rainfall between 1200 and 3000 mm. It does not like shade and usually grows in areas whose vegetation is primarily herbs and shrubs. They can be found growing on road cuts, unsteady slopes and landslidesareas, disrupting work at these sites.

== Morphology ==
The plant is mainly supported by its roots which are lateral, rigid but flexible. It usually has one main stem and it is covered by bark of brownish grey color with small lenticels over inner bark of pinkish-brown color. The species is monopodial, in which the main stem continually maintains to produce the branches and some of those become thicker and develop into the main branches for older plants. The leaves are alternate and they are connected to twigs by 8 to 10 m long of petioles. Their blades are approximately 2-4(-6) × 2-2.5(-3) cm ovate-lantiolate, green color and have rough surfaces.

== Flowers and fruit ==
After it grows up to 1 m, it begins to produce flowers and fruits. During the time it favors moisture, it produces abundant numbers of fruits and seeds. The average weight of fruits collected in Puerto Rico was 0.0077 ± 0.0001 g/fruit. The average weight of air-dried seeds was 0.0024 ± 0.0000 g/seed, in other words, 1 kg held 416,000 seeds. Approximately, 60–120 days after sowing in commercial potting mix, 38 percent of seeds have germinated. Birds scatter the seeds. Seedlings are usually seen on disturbed area where seed-bearing plants exist. Young plants tend to grow when forest lands are cut.

== Growth and management ==
They grow slowly at early stage. Later, they grow 1 m/year and the growth rate declines as they become old. Its lifespan is 10 to 20 years. According to the record, the species is not weedy. Reproduction can be enhanced by disturbing the soil close to seed-bearing plants before the seasonal rain begins.

== Benefits ==
The role of species is very important in disrupted ground. It colonizes and helps prevent soil from erosion. It might be practical for site stabilization plantings even though it has never been used. Trema lamarckianum has been recorded as a nitrogen-fixing species (Winrock International 2002). The wood is smooth and rarely used. The fruits it bears are significant nutrients for endangered Puerto Rican plain pigeons, Columba inornata webmorei (Division of Endangered Species 2002).

== Synonyms ==
- Celtis lamarckiana Roem. & Schult.
- Sponia lamarckiana (Roem. & Schult.) Decne.
- Celtis lima Lam.
- Trema lima authors, not Blume
- Trema lamarckiana
