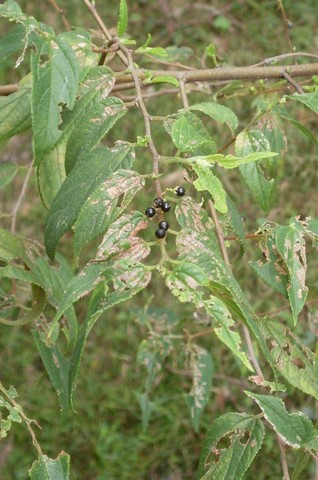
- Trema tomentosum at Elvina Bay, Australia

Scientific classification
- Kingdom: Plantae
- Clade: Tracheophytes
- Clade: Angiosperms
- Clade: Eudicots
- Clade: Rosids
- Order: Rosales
- Family: Cannabaceae
- Genus: Trema
- Species: T. tomentosum

Binomial name
- Trema tomentosum (Roxb.) H.Hara, 1971

= Trema tomentosum =

Poison peach

Species of shrub

Trema tomentosum, also known as T. tomentosa and commonly called poison peach, is a shrub or tree in the family Cannabaceae native to the Indian subcontinent, south east Asia, through the islands of the south west Pacific, and the east coast and northern half of Australia.

== Description ==
The monoecious small tree or shrub typically grows to a height of 1 to 5 metres (3.3 to 16.4 ft). It blooms between October and April producing green-white flowers followed by black fruit. The evergreen tree has pubescent young branches. The light green, scabrous leaves have a ovate to lanceolate shape. The leaf blade is 2 to 8 centimetres (0.79 to 3.15 in) in length and 10 to 30 millimetres (0.39 to 1.18 in) wide. The leaves are arranged alternately with serrated margins and have three veins at the base. The flowers are unisexual and are found on axillary cymes. The fleshy ovoid shaped fruit have a diameter of 2 to 6 mm (0.079 to 0.236 in). The fruits and leaves are toxic to stock.

== Taxonomy ==
The plant was first described as Celtis tomentosa by William Roxburgh in 1832, then to the current name by the botanist Hiroshi Hara in 1971. The specific epithet is taken from the Latin word tomentose meaning covered with short or matted hairs that describes the surface covering of the leaves. There are two different varieties of the plant:

- Trema tomentosum var. viride (Planch.) Hewson
- Trema tomentosum (Roxb.) H.Hara var. tomentosum

== Distribution ==
The shrub is native to from India in the west through most of south east Asia to China in the west. It is found the through the islands of the south west Pacific including Indonesia, Borneo, New Guinea and New Caledonia. In Australia, the species is found among vine thickets and tussock grasslands in the Kimberley region of Western Australia where it grows in skeletal sandy soils over laterite or sandstone. It is also found in Queensland, Victoria and New South Wales. It can be situated on the margins of forested areas.
