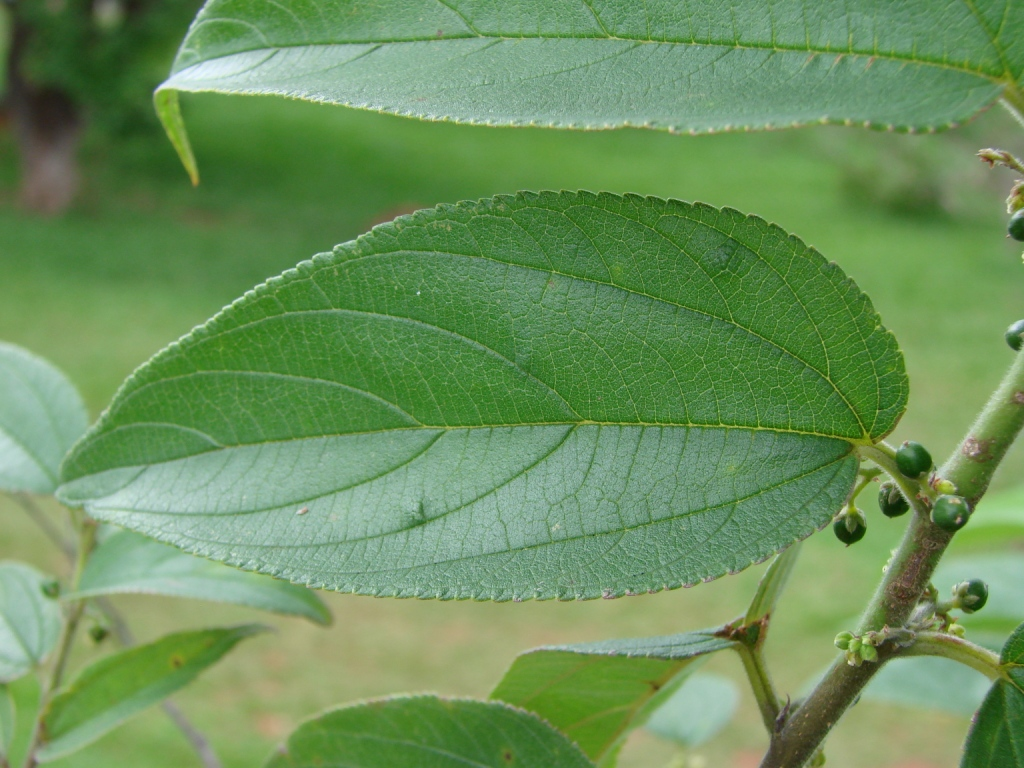
- In Brasília

Scientific classification
- Kingdom: Plantae
- Clade: Tracheophytes
- Clade: Angiosperms
- Clade: Eudicots
- Clade: Rosids
- Order: Rosales
- Family: Cannabaceae
- Genus: Trema
- Species: T. micranthum

Binomial name
- Trema micranthum (L.) Blume

Synonyms
- List: Calyptracordia alba (Jacq.) Britton; Cordia alba (Jacq.) Roem. & Schult; Gerascanthus albus (Jacq.) Borhidi; Lithocardium album (Jacq.) Kuntze; Lithocardium album Kuntze; Celtis albicans Willd. ex Steud.; Celtis canescens Kunth; Celtis chichilea Ruiz & Pav. ex Planch.; Celtis curiandiuba M.Gómez ex Planch.; Celtis lima Lam.; Celtis macrophylla Kunth; Celtis micrantha (L.) Sw.; Celtis microcarpa Salzm. ex Planch.; Celtis mollis Humb. & Bonpl. ex Willd.; Celtis rufescens Banks ex Planch.; Celtis schiedeana Schltdl.; Rhamnus micrantha L. (Basionym); Sponia canescens (Kunth) Decne.; Sponia chichilea Planch.; Sponia crassifolia Liebm.; Sponia grisea Liebm.; Sponia lima Decne.; Sponia macrophylla (Kunth) Decne.; Sponia micrantha (L.) Decne. ex Planch.; Sponia micrantha (L.) Decne.; Sponia mollis Decne.; Sponia peruviana Klotzsch; Sponia riparia Decne.; Sponia schiedeana (Schltdl.) Planch.; Trema canescens (Kunth) Blume; Trema chichilea (Planch.) Blume; Trema floridana Britton ex Small; Trema lima Blume; Trema macrophylla (Kunth) Blume; Trema melinona Blume; Trema micrantha var. obtusatum Urb.; Trema micrantha var. strigillosa (Lundell) Standl. & Steyerm.; Trema mollis (Humb. & Bonpl. ex Willd.) Blume; Trema riparia Blume; Trema rufescens Blume; Trema schiedeana (Schltdl.) Blume; Trema strigillosa Lundell; Urtica alnifolia Bertero ex Griseb.

= Trema micranthum =

Species of tree

Trema micranthum (sometimes Trema micrantha), the Jamaican nettletree or capulin, is a plant species native to warmer parts of the Western Hemisphere. It has been reported from Mexico, Central America, tropical South America, the Virgin Islands, Jamaica, Cuba, Hispaniola, Puerto Rico, and southern Florida.

== Description ==
Trema micranthrum is a shrub or small pioneer tree up to 10 m (33 ft) tall or more. Leaves are egg-shaped, up to 9 cm (3.5 in) long, green on top but covered with white, woolly pubescence underneath. Flowers are greenish-white. Fruits are yellow to bright reddish-range, up to 4 mm (0.16 in) in diameter. It is noted for its fast growth rate; as much as 14 m (46 ft) in two years has been recorded.

== Uses ==
Following the recent local extirpation of slow-growing xalama in San Pablito, Mexico due to unsustainable harvesting driven by tourism, the Otomi people now use T. micranthum bark strips as a raw material for making handmade amate paper.

== Phytochemicals ==
Claims have been made that T. micranthum may contain cannabidiol, a non-psychoactive but medicinally useful component known from Cannabis. However, as with similar claims previously made about the related plant Trema orientale, such claims have not yet been independently replicated by other researchers and are not yet widely accepted by the scientific community. Also, a more recent publication did not provide conclusive evidence, e.g. in the form of fragmentation spectra or the analysis of isolated compounds by NMR.
