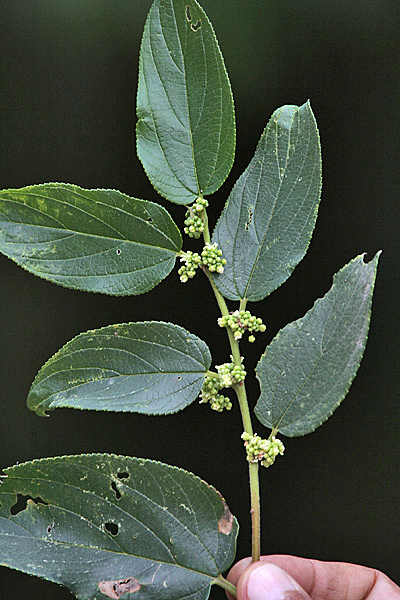
- Flowers & leaves of Trema orientale at Kolkata, West Bengal, India

Scientific classification
- Kingdom: Plantae
- Clade: Tracheophytes
- Clade: Angiosperms
- Clade: Eudicots
- Clade: Rosids
- Order: Rosales
- Family: Cannabaceae
- Genus: Trema; Lour. 1790

Species
- About 15 species; see text

Synonyms
- Parasponia Miq. 1851; Sponia Comm. ex Decne. 1834

= Trema (plant) =

Genus of flowering plants belonging to the hop and hemp family

Trema is a genus of evergreen trees closely related to the hackberries (Celtis), occurring in subtropical and tropical regions of southern Asia, northern Australasia, Africa, South and Central America, and parts of North America. They are generally small trees, reaching 10–20 m (33–66 ft) tall.

== Taxonomy ==
Previously included either in the elm family, Ulmaceae, or with Celtis in the Celtidaceae, genetic analysis has shown the Celtidaceae are best placed in the hemp family, Cannabaceae.

== Description ==
The leaves are alternate, simple, 7–15 cm (2.8–5.9 in) long, ovate-acuminate to lanceolate with a long pointed tip, and evenly serrated margins. The fruit is a small drupe 3–5 mm (0.12–0.20 in) in diameter.

== Species associations ==
Trema species are sometimes used as food plants by the larvae of hepialid moths of the genera Aenetus, including A. splendens, which burrow horizontally into the trunk then vertically down, and Endoclita, including E. malabaricus.

Some Trema species unusually able to live in symbiosis with rhizobia for nitrogen fixation as a non-legume. In this case it is customary to mention these species as a separate genus Parasponia.

== Uses ==
Trema orientale is widely planted for land reclamation in southern Asia, valued for its tolerance of poor soils due to its ability to fix nitrogen. It is also an invasive species on some Pacific Ocean islands.

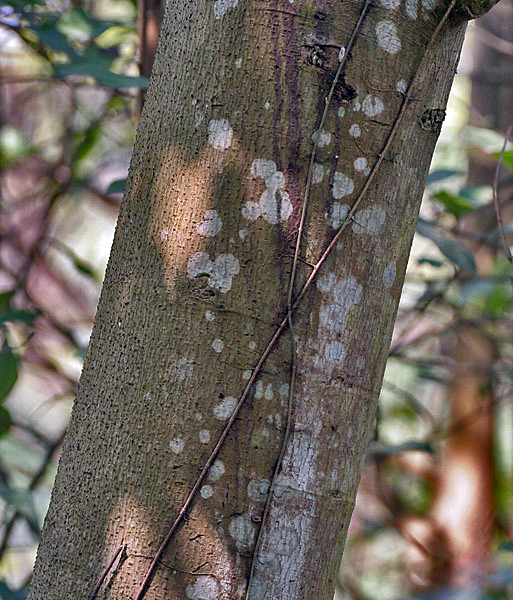
Bark of T. orientalis at Kolkata, West Bengal, India

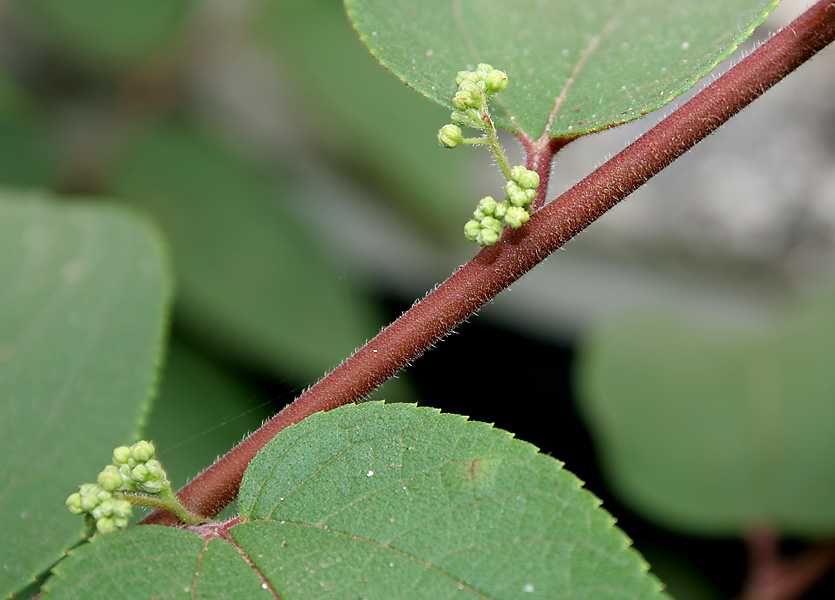
Flowers of T. orientale in Goa, India.

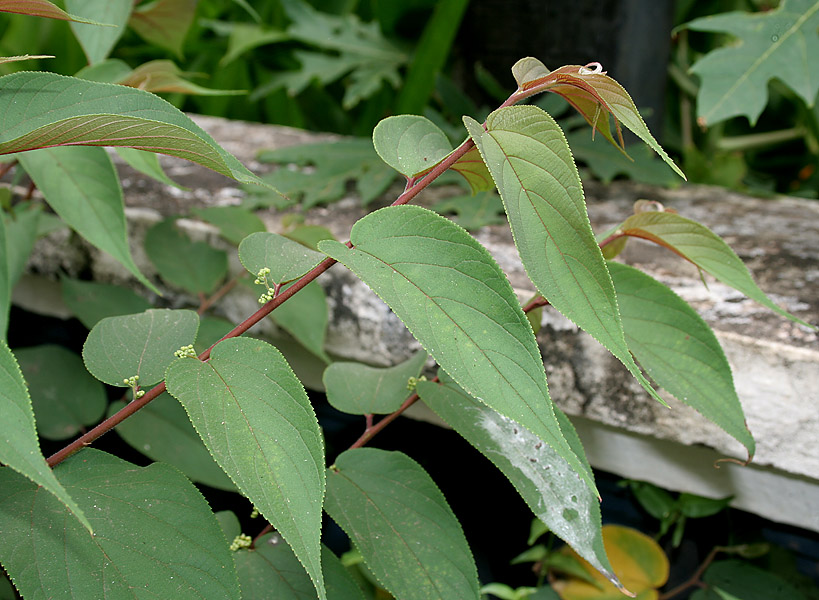
Leaves of T. orientale in Goa, India.

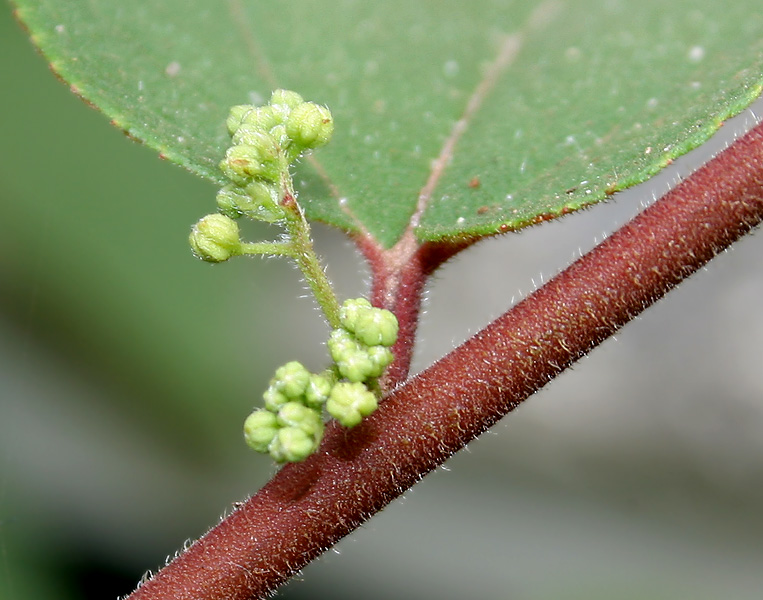
Flowers of T. orientale in Goa, India.

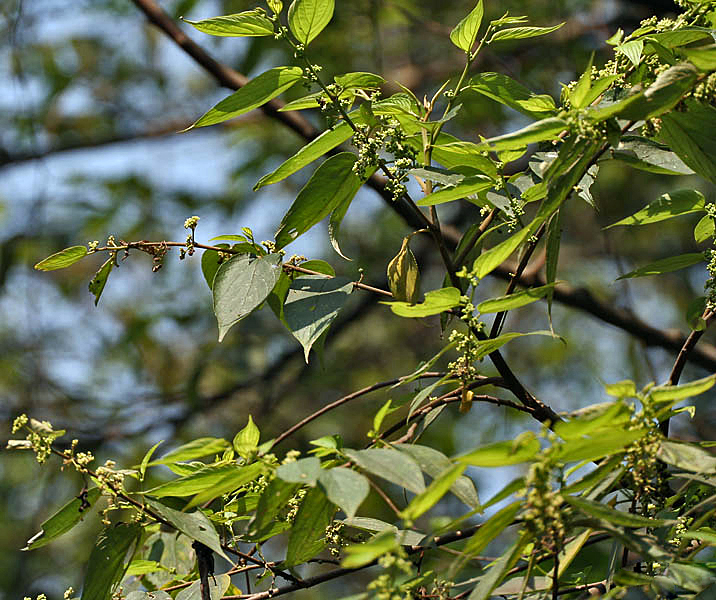
Branches of T. orientale at Kolkata, West Bengal, India

== Species ==
Trema comprises the following species:

- Trema andersonii (Planch.) Byng & Christenh.
- Trema angustifolium (Planch.) Blume
- Trema cannabina Lour. – type species - Lesser trema (many synonyms including T. vieillardii (Planch.) Schltr.)
- Trema cubense Urb.
- Trema discolor (Brongniart) Blume
- Trema domingense Urb.
- Trema eurhynchum (Miq.) Byng & Christenh.
- Trema humbertii J.-F.Leroy
- Trema lamarckianum (Roem. & Schult.) Blume – West Indian trema, Lamarck's trema
- Trema levigatum Hand.-Mazz.
- Trema melastomatifolium (J.J.Sm.) Byng & Christenh.
- Trema micranthum (L.) Blume – Jamaican nettle tree
- Trema nitidum C.J. Chen
- Trema orientale (L.) Blume – Pigeon wood (synonym T. affinis (Planch.) Blume, T. orientalis)
- Trema parviflorum (Miq.) Byng & Christenh.
- Trema politoria (Planch.) Blume
- Trema simulans (Merr. & L.M.Perry) Byng & Christenh.
- Trema tomentosum (Roxb.) H.Hara – Poison peach
  - var. tomentosum (Roxb.) H.Hara
  - var. viride (Planch.) Hewson – eastern Australia (synonym T. asperum (Brongn.) Blume)

=== Species names with uncertain taxonomic status ===
The status of the following species is unresolved:

- Trema acuminatissima Boerl.
- Trema argentea Blume
- Trema blancoi Blume
- Trema bracteolata Blume
- Trema burmanni Blume
- Trema carinata Blume
- Trema crassifolia Liebm.
- Trema glabrescens Blume
- Trema glomerata Blume
- Trema griffithii Blume
- Trema guinensis Priemer
- Trema imbricata Blume
- Trema lancifolia Ridl.
- Trema malaccensis Gand.
- Trema morifolia Blume
- Trema pallida Blume
- Trema philippinensis Elmer
- Trema pubigera Blume
- Trema rigida Blume
- Trema rugosa Blume
- Trema scaberrima Blume
- Trema sieberi Blume
- Trema strigilosa Lundell
- Trema strigosa Blume
- Trema viridis Blume
- Trema vulcanica Merr.
