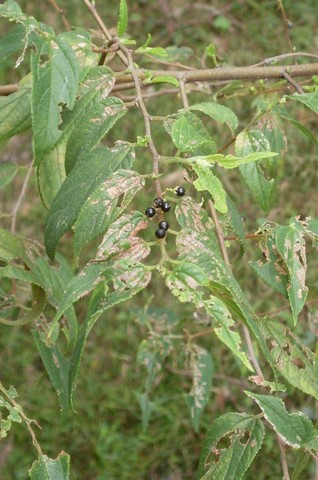
- Poison peach at Elvina Bay, Australia

Scientific classification
- Kingdom: Plantae
- Clade: Tracheophytes
- Clade: Angiosperms
- Clade: Eudicots
- Clade: Rosids
- Order: Rosales
- Family: Cannabaceae
- Genus: Trema
- Species: T. tomentosum
- Variety: †T. t. var. viride

Trinomial name
- †Trema tomentosum var. viride Planch. & Hewson

Synonyms
- Trema aspera Brongn. & Blume; Trema tormentosa Roxb. & H.Hara; Celtis aspera Roxb.

= Trema tomentosum var. viride =

Variety of tree

Trema tomentosum var. viride (or Trema tomentosa var. viridis) is a forest plant. In Australia it occurs from Twofold Bay (37° S) in New South Wales to far northern Queensland, New Guinea and Western New Guinea. It had been recorded near Mallacoota, but is now presumed extinct in the state of Victoria.

Common names include poison peach, native peach and peach-leaved poison bush. The poison peach is well regarded by rainforest regenerators for quick growth, shelter and shade and as a nursery species, and as a bird-attracting plant. The habitat is rainforest regrowth, in disturbed open areas of rainforest, by forest roads, and in open forest country.

== Description ==
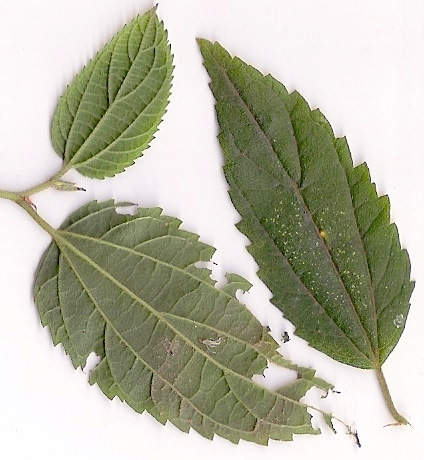
Trema tomentosum var. viride from Eastwood, New South Wales, Australia

A shrub or small tree reaching a height of 8 metres and a stem diameter of 15 cm. The bark is smooth and grey, dotted with small lenticels, arranged in vertical and horizontal patterns. The grey or fawn coloured branchlets also feature lenticels.

Leaves alternate with a finely toothed edge. 4 to 9 cm long, ovate shaped with a long pointed tip. Leaf stalk 6 to 12 mm long. Leaf veins prominent on both sides, more evident underneath, particularly the lateral veins in threes. Leaves resemble the invasive weed Lantana camara.

Small greenish flowers in short cymes, appear year round, though most often between December and March. The fruit is a tiny black drupe, 2 to 6 mm in diameter, with a single black seed. The fruit matures between February and August and is eaten by a variety of birds, including brown cuckoo-dove, Australasian figbird, Lewin's honeyeater, and olive-backed oriole. Germination is not difficult from fresh seed or cuttings.
