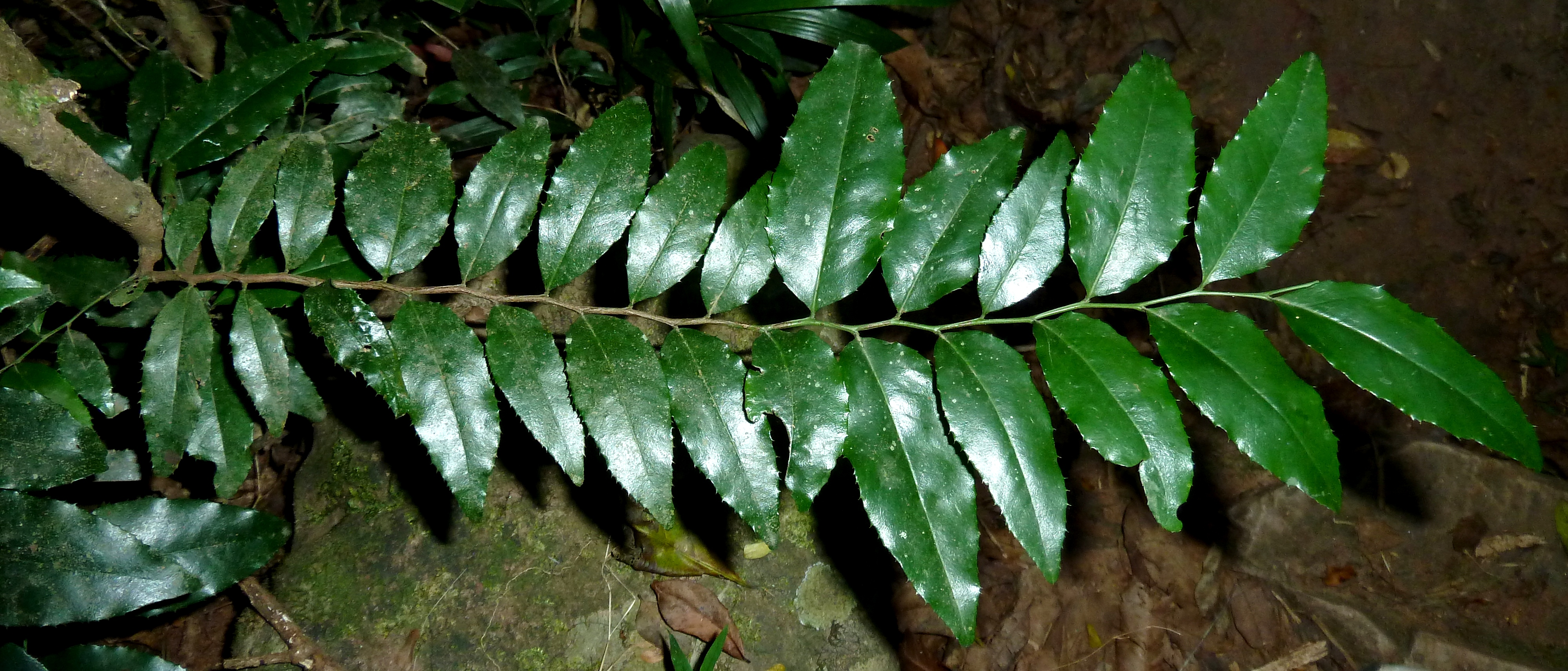

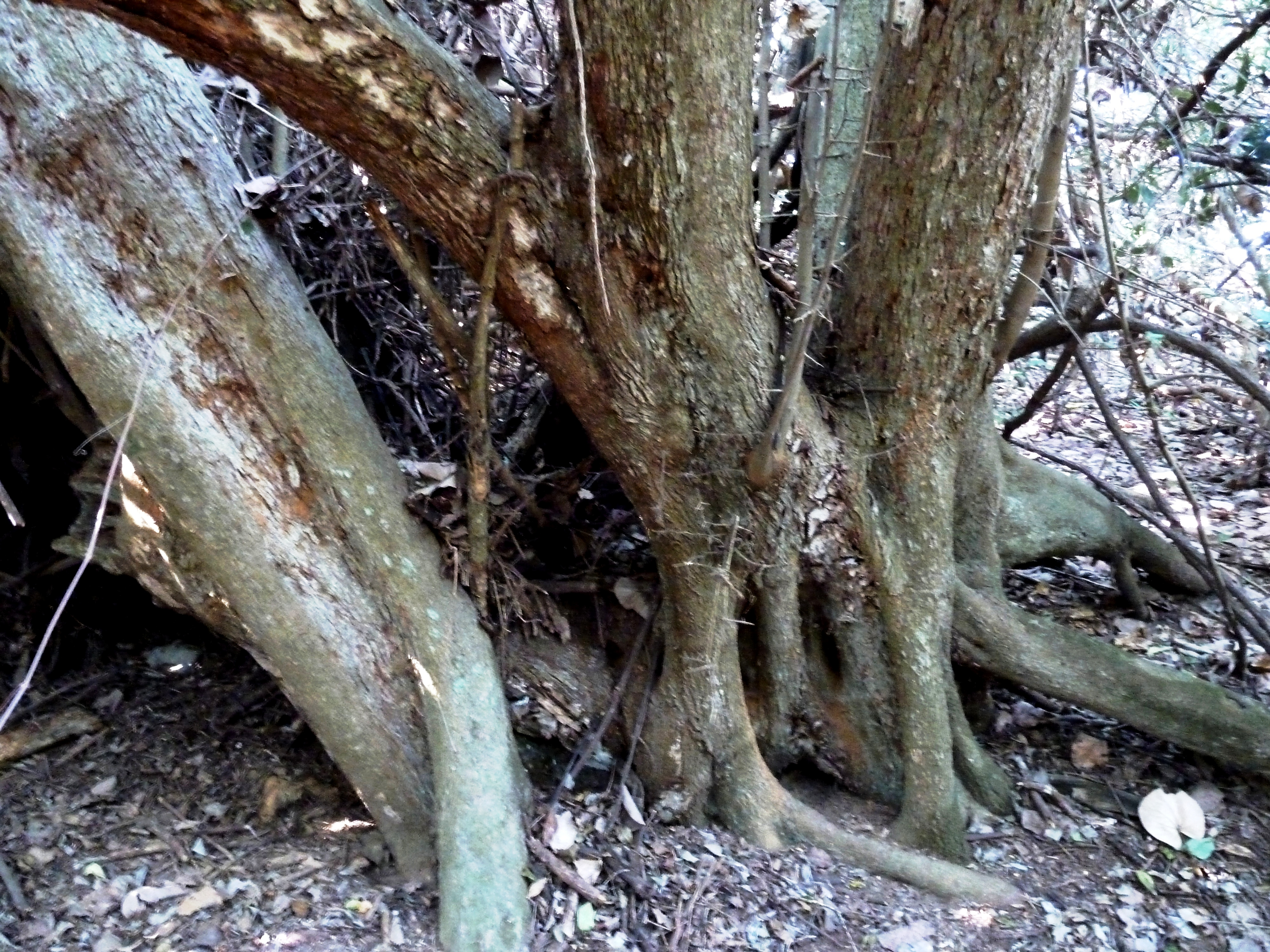

Conservation status
- Least Concern (IUCN 3.1)

Scientific classification
- Kingdom: Plantae
- Clade: Tracheophytes
- Clade: Angiosperms
- Clade: Eudicots
- Clade: Rosids
- Order: Rosales
- Family: Cannabaceae
- Genus: Chaetachme; Planch.
- Species: C. aristata

Binomial name
- Chaetachme aristata E.Mey. ex Planch.

Synonyms
- Celtis appendiculata E.Mey. ex Planch.; Celtis subdentata E.Mey. ex Planch.; Chaetachme madagascariensis Baker; Chaetachme meyeri Harv.; Chaetachme microcarpa Rendle; Chaetachme nitida Planch. & Harv.; Chaetachme serrata Engl.

= Chaetachme =

Genus of flowering plants

Chaetachme is a monotypic genus of flowering plants native to eastern and western Africa, including Madagascar, containing the single species Chaetachme aristata. Its English common name is thorny elm, and it is known as muyuyu in Kikuyu. Traditionally placed in the Elm family, it is more recently placed in the family Cannabaceae, thought to be possibly closely related to Celtis.

Chaetachme aristata is a shrub or small tree growing up to 10 metres (33 ft) tall. It has drooping, angular branches covered with spines up to 3.5 centimetres (1.4 in) in length. The lance-shaped leaves are up to 11 centimetres (4.3 in) long by 5 centimetres (2.0 in) wide, pointed at the tip and smooth or serrated on the edges. The shrub is dioecious and sexually dimorphic, with male and female flower types borne on separate individuals, although it may also be monoecious.

This shrub is host to the mirid bug Volumnus chaetacme.

The spiny branches of the shrub are used as fences in African villages.
