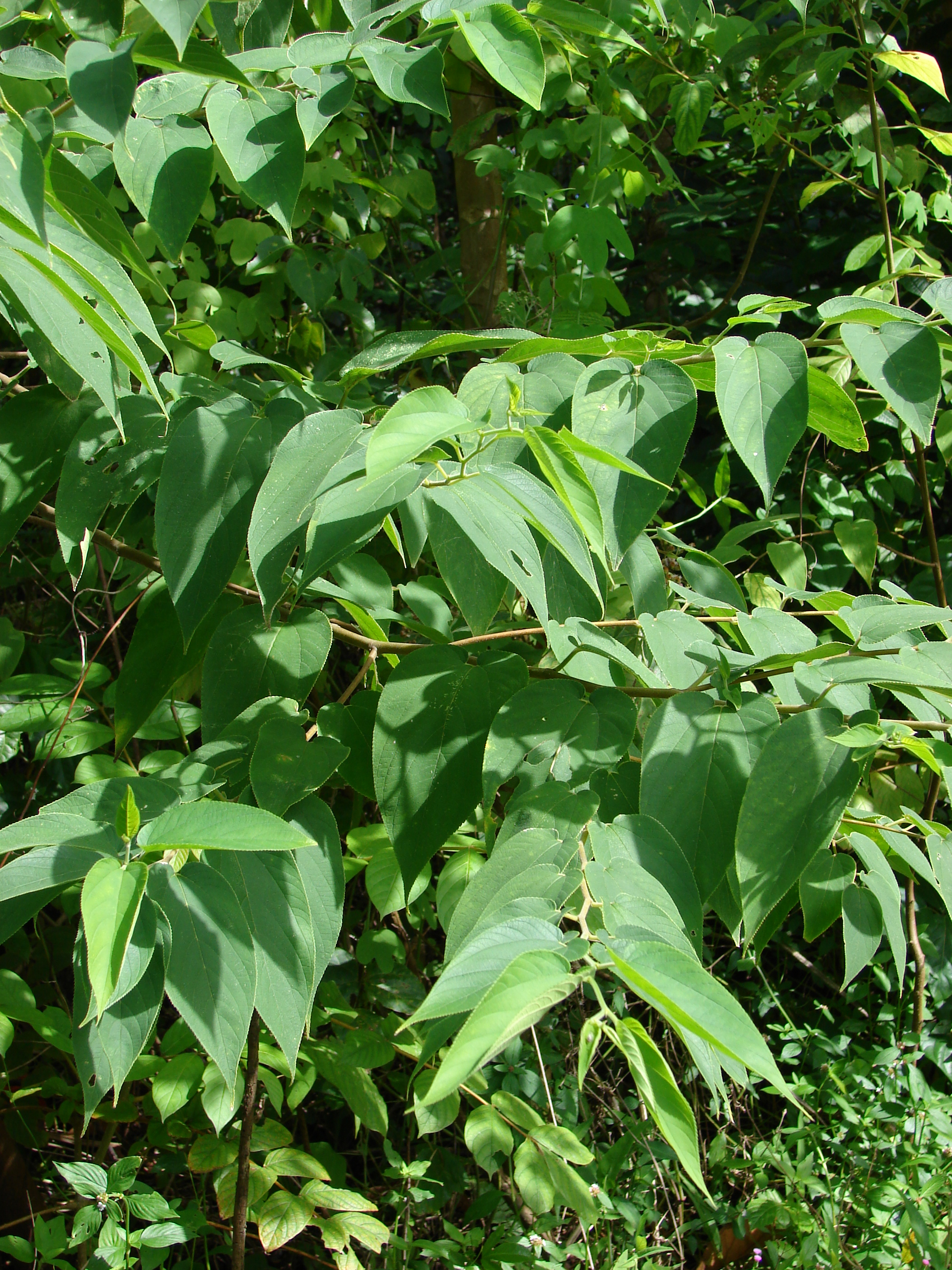

Conservation status
- Least Concern (IUCN 3.1)

Scientific classification
- Kingdom: Plantae
- Clade: Tracheophytes
- Clade: Angiosperms
- Clade: Eudicots
- Clade: Rosids
- Order: Rosales
- Family: Cannabaceae
- Genus: Trema
- Species: T. orientale

Binomial name
- Trema orientale (L.) Blume

Synonyms
- List: Celtis commersonii Brongn.; Celtis glomerata Hochst.; Celtis guineensis Schumach. & Thonn.; Celtis laeta Salisb.; Celtis madagascariensis Bojer; Celtis orientalis L.; Celtis rigida Blume; Sponia affinis Planch.; Sponia africana Planch.; Sponia andaresa Comm. ex Lam.; Sponia argentea Planch.; Sponia bracteolata Hochst.; Sponia commersonii Decne. ex Planch.; Sponia glomerata Hochst.; Sponia guineensis (Schumach. & Thonn.) Planch.; Sponia hochstetteri Planch.; Sponia lucida Hassk.; Sponia nitens Hook.f. ex Planch.; Sponia orientalis (L.) Decne. ex Planch.; Sponia rigida (Blume) Decne. ex Planch.; Sponia scaberrima Miq.; Sponia strigosa Planch.; Sponia wightii Planch.; Trema affine (Planch.) Blume; Trema africanum (Planch.) Blume; Trema argenteum (Planch.) Blume; Trema bracteolatum (Hochst.) Blume; Trema burmanni Blume; Trema commersonii (Decne. ex Planch.) Blume; Trema glomeratum (Hochst.) Blume; Trema grevei Baill.; Trema griseum Baker; Trema guineense (Schumach. & Thonn.) Ficalho; Trema hochstetteri (Planch.) Engl.; Trema nitens (Hook.f. ex Planch.) Blume; Trema rigidum (Blume) Blume; Trema scaberrimum (Miq.) Blume; Trema sieberi Blume

= Trema orientale =

Species of tree

Trema orientale (sometimes Trema orientalis) is a species of flowering tree in the hemp family, Cannabaceae. It is known by many common names, including charcoal-tree, Indian charcoal-tree, pigeon wood, Oriental trema, and in Hawaii, where it has become naturalized, gunpowder tree, or nalita. It has a near universal distribution in tropical and warm temperate parts of the Old World, with a range extending from South Africa, through the Middle East, the Indian subcontinent and southern China to Southeast Asia and Australia.

== Distribution ==
Trema orientale is native to tropical and southern Africa (including Madagascar), Asia (the Arabian Peninsula, China, eastern Asia, tropical Asia) and Australia.

== Uses ==
The wood is relatively soft, and burns easily and quickly when dry. The wood is suitable for paper and pulp production, producing paper with good tensile strength and folding endurance. The bark can be used for making string or rope, and used as waterproofing fishing-lines. In India and Tanzania, the wood is used to make charcoal and is a good fire starter.

=== Medicinal use ===
The tree has various uses as an herbal medicine in a wide range of cultures. The leaves and the bark are used to treat coughs, sore throats, asthma, bronchitis, gonorrhea, yellow fever, toothache, and as an antidote to general poisoning. A bark infusion is reportedly drunk to control dysentery and a leaf decoction is used to deworm dogs. In recent pharmacological studies, an aqueous extract from the bark has been shown to reduce blood sugar levels in an experimental animal model of diabetes mellitus, and may be useful for treating this disease. Extracts from leaves of related species (Trema guineense and Trema micrantha) showed anti-inflammatory, anti-arthritic and analgesic activity in rodents, suggesting that T. orientale could produce similar results.

=== Phytochemicals ===
Trema orientalis has been reported to contain cannabinoids such as tetrahydrocannabinol (30 mg/kg-90 mg/kg avg), cannabinol (130 mg/kg-357 mg/kg avg) and cannabidiol (2 mg/kg-5 mg/kg avg). Identification was performed by comparing the retention time of HPLC and GC analysis. However these results have not yet been independently replicated, and have been disputed.

== Ecology ==
This species has a high ecological impact with at least 14 species of butterfly using it as a larval food plant. Several species of birds eat the fruit or feed on the abundant insects which live in these trees. Pigeons and doves are often found in these trees where they eat the fruits or make their nests; giving the origin of the name 'Pigeon Wood'. The leaves, pods and seeds are used as fodder for cattle, buffaloes and goats in the Philippines. The leaves are also browsed by game animals and can be used as spinach. This tree is a fast-growing species found in previously disturbed areas and on forest margins. It is a pioneer species that can grow on poor soil and can be used to regenerate forest areas by providing shade and protection to saplings of forest hardwoods. T. orientale is nitrogen fixing and can thereby improve soil fertility for other plant species.

== Gallery ==
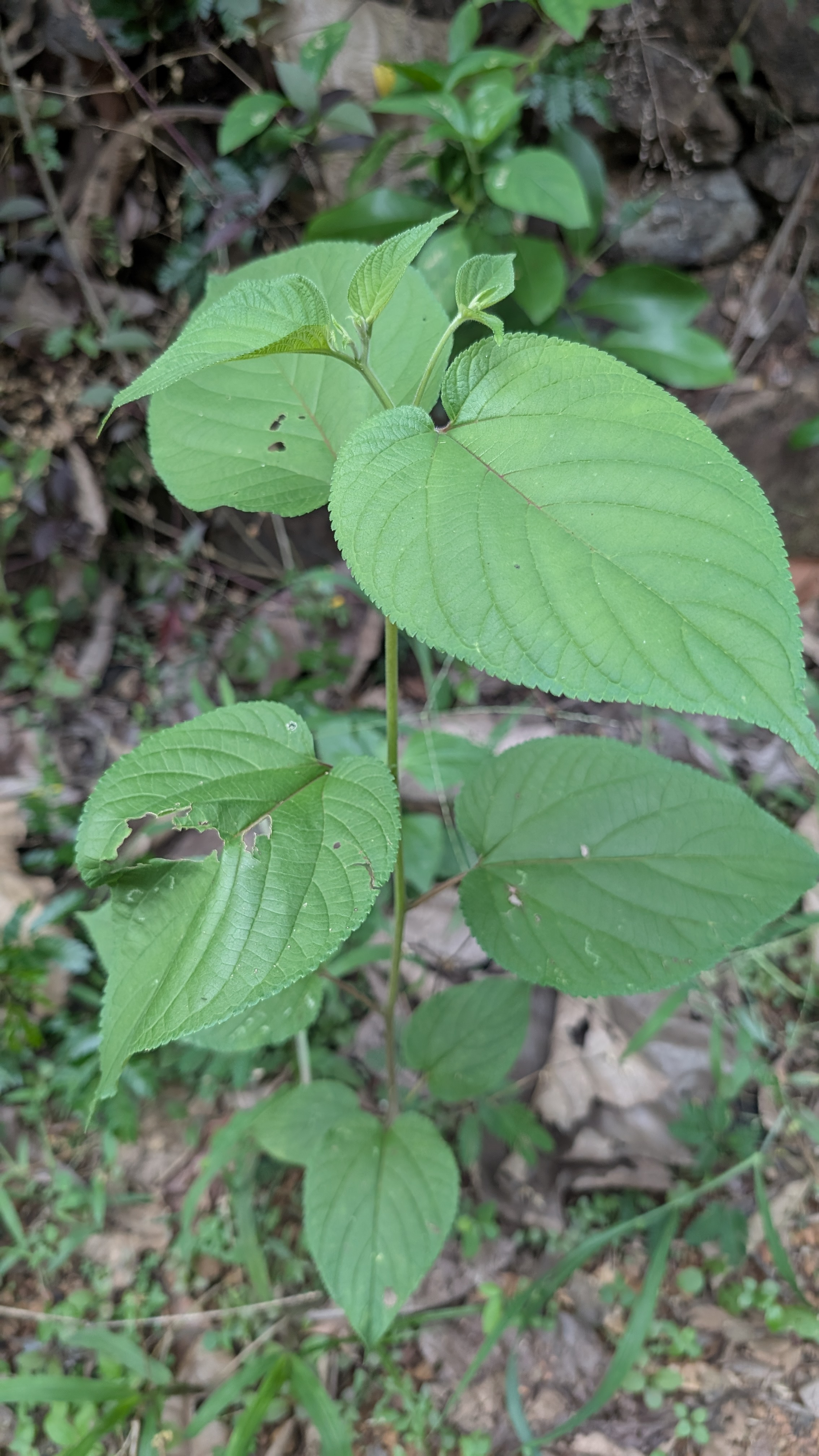
Trema orientalis

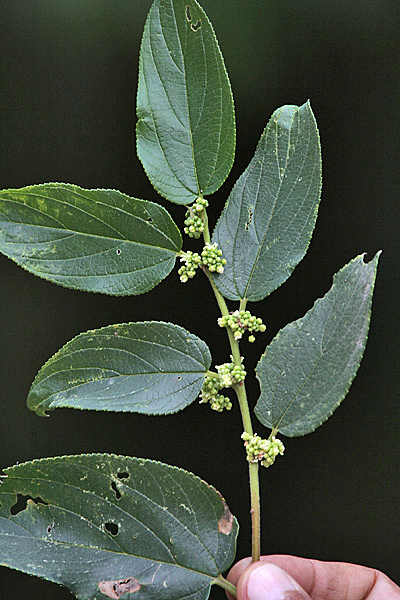
Flowers and leaves

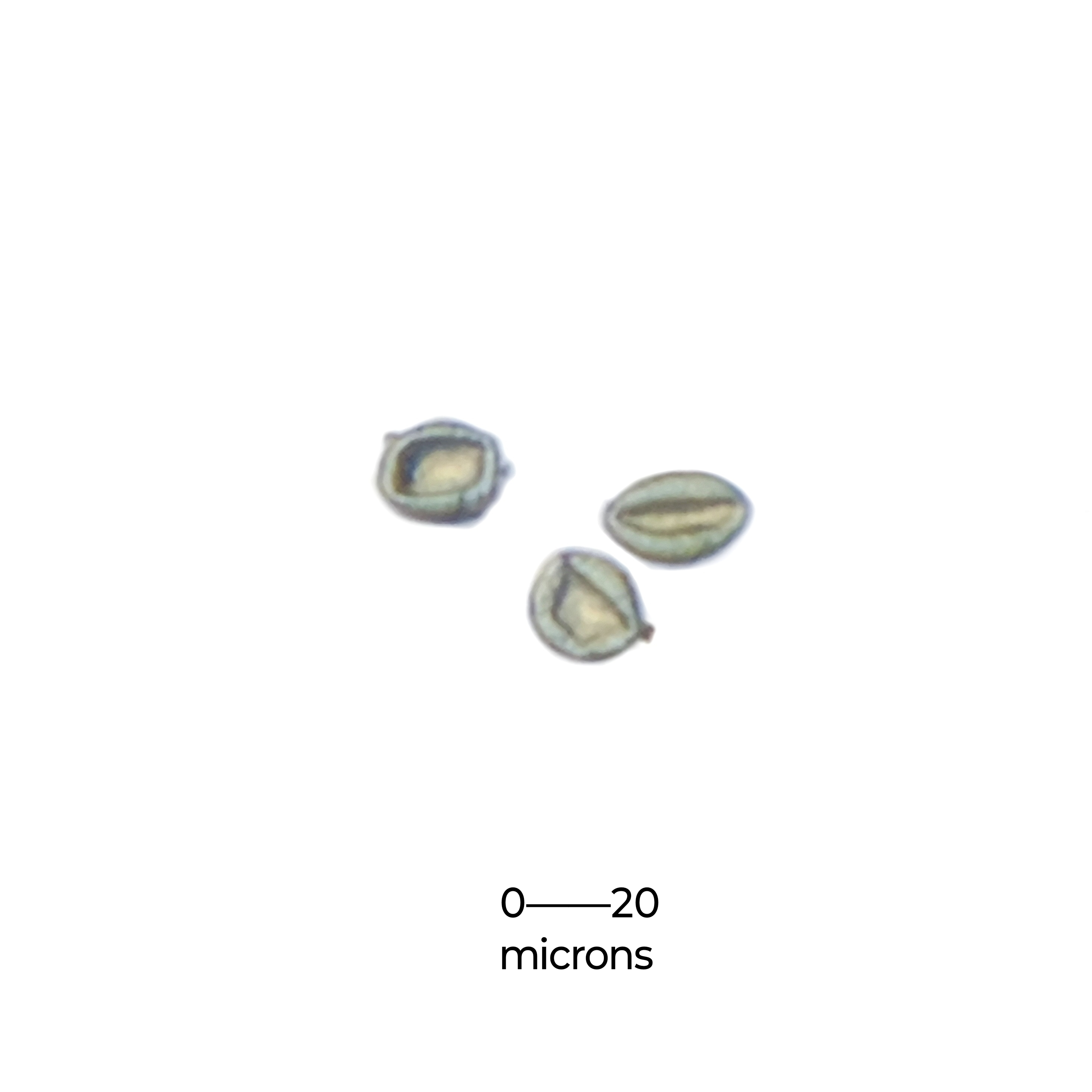
Pollen grains of Trema orientale

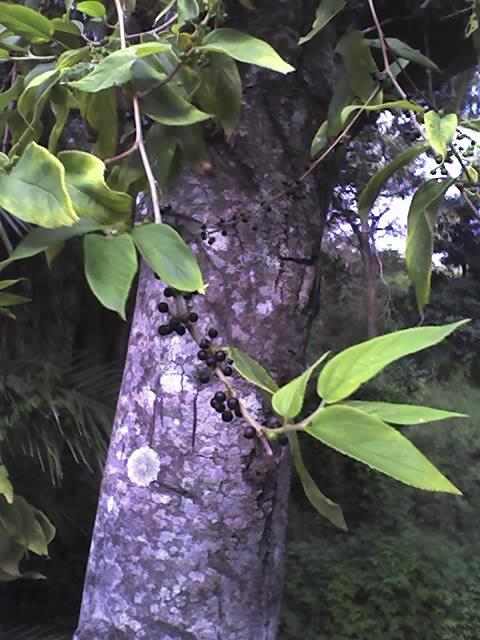
Ripe fruit and bark

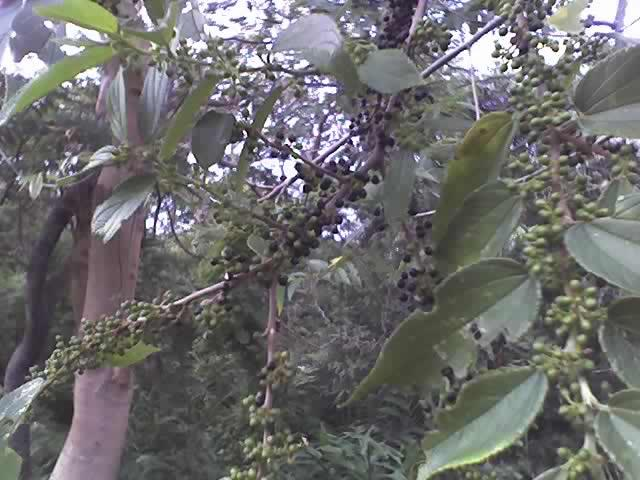
Green and ripe (black) fruit

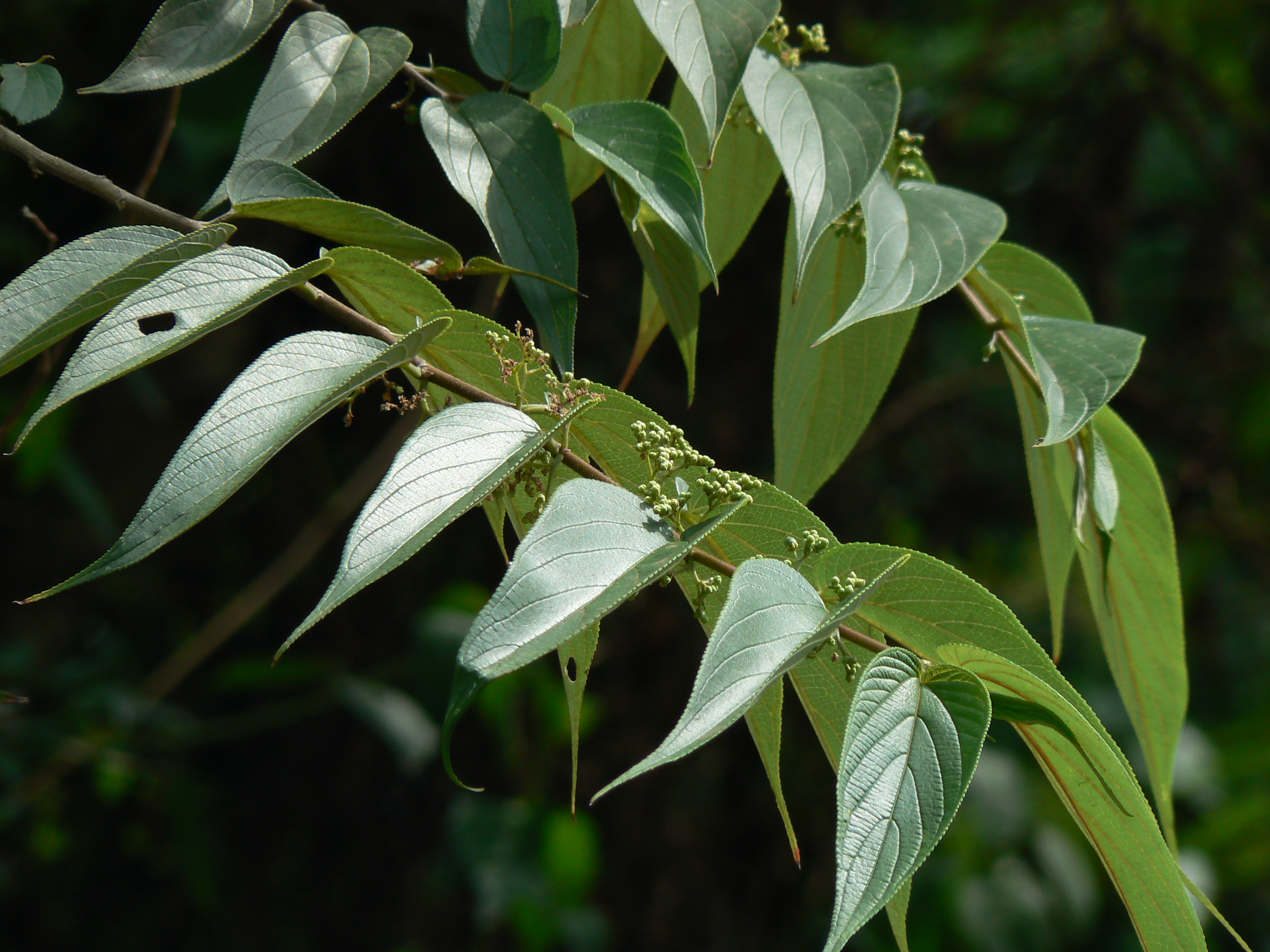
Branch bent down to show leaves and fruit

== Bibliography ==
- Pooley, E. (1993). The Complete Field Guide to Trees of Natal, Zululand and Transkei. ISBN 0-620-17697-0.
