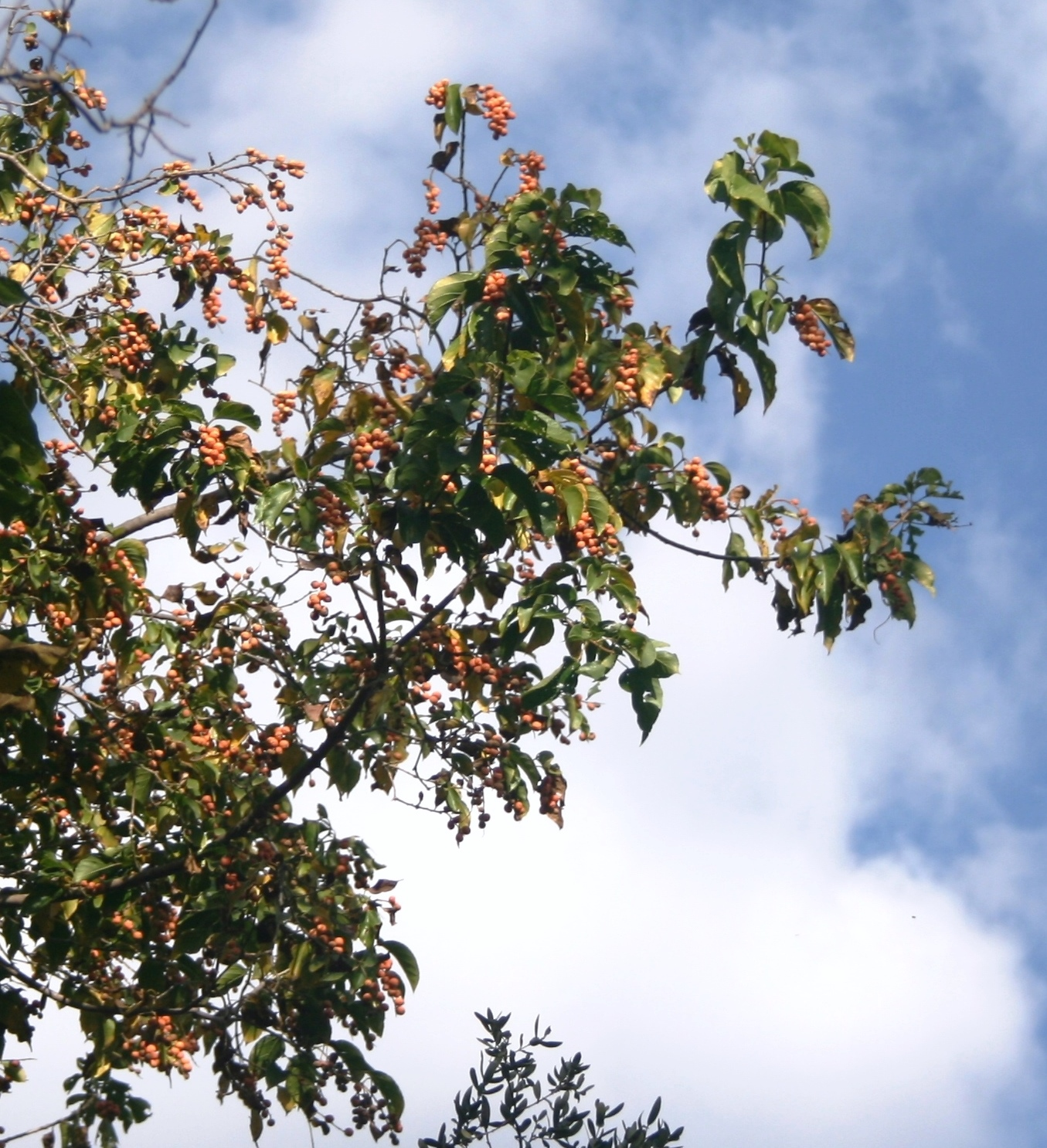
- Fruiting branches, winter

Conservation status
- Least Concern (IUCN 3.1)

Scientific classification
- Kingdom: Plantae
- Clade: Tracheophytes
- Clade: Angiosperms
- Clade: Eudicots
- Clade: Rosids
- Order: Malpighiales
- Family: Euphorbiaceae
- Genus: Croton
- Species: C. sylvaticus

Binomial name
- Croton sylvaticus Hochst.

Synonyms
- Oxydectes sylvatica (Hochst.) Kuntze; Claoxylon sphaerocarpum Kuntze; Croton asperifolius Pax; Croton bukobensis Pax; Croton oxypetalus Müll.Arg.; Croton stuhlmannii Pax; Croton verdickii De Wild.; Oxydectes oxypetala (Müll.Arg.) Kuntze

= Croton sylvaticus =

Forest fever-berry

Species of flowering plant

Croton sylvaticus is a tree in the family Euphorbiaceae. It is commonly known as the forest fever-berry. These trees are distributed in forests from the east coast of South Africa to Tropical Africa. It grows 7–13 metres (23–43 ft) in height, occasionally up to 30 metres (100 ft), in moist forests, thickets and forest edges at altitudes of 350–1,800 metres (1,100–5,900 ft).

== Flowers and fruit ==
Greenish cream flowers, up to 3 millimetres (15/128 in) long (all male or female or mixed flowers), in racemes, 10–30 centimetres (4–12 in) long. Fruit, light green when young, turning to orange or red, trilobed, oval in shape, hairy.

== Uses ==
Used as a general timber, for poles, posts and as a fuel.

== Phytochemistry ==
Mwangi et al 1998 find β-caryophyllene oxide, α-humulene-1,2-epoxide, hardwickiic acid, β-sitosterol and stigmasterol in the extracts. This contrasts with Sadgrove et al 2019 who find almost entirely bicyclogermacrene in the essential oil.

== Traditional medicine ==
Sap from leaves is used for healing cuts, bark is used in the treatment of malaria, a decoction from the bark of the roots is taken orally as a remedy for tuberculosis, an infusion of the leaves acts as a purgative.

== Gallery ==
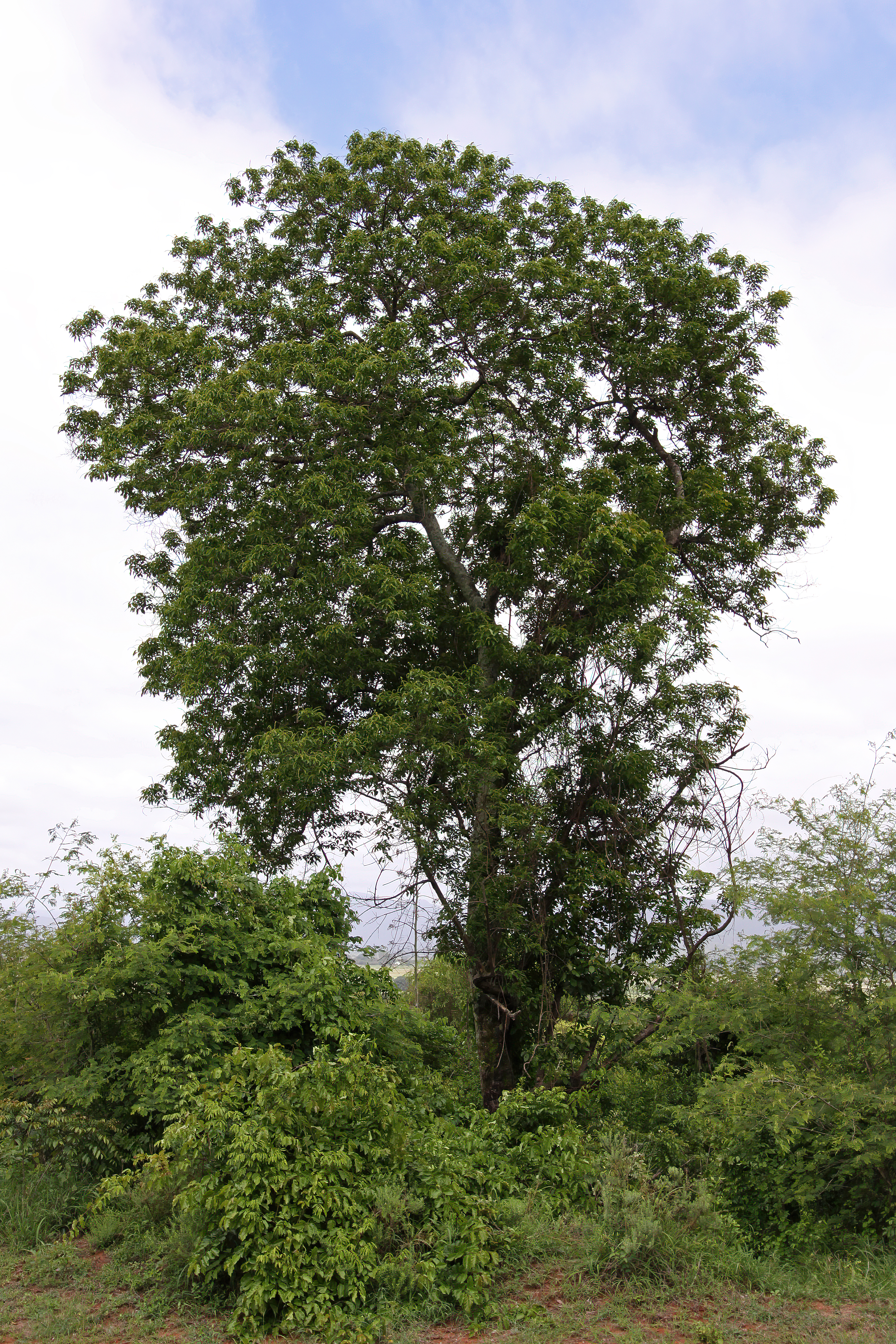
Tree

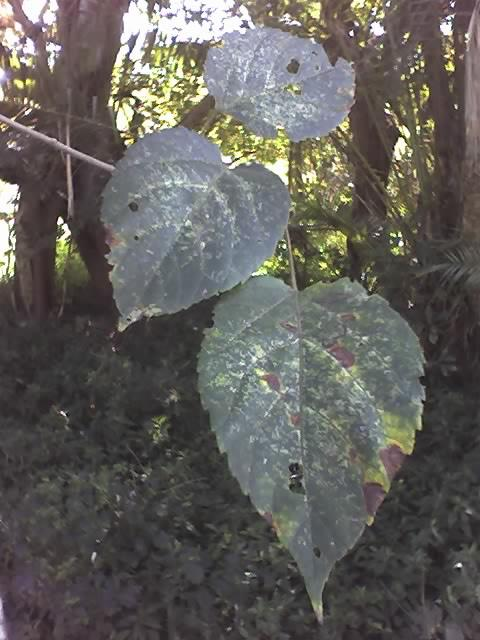
Leaves

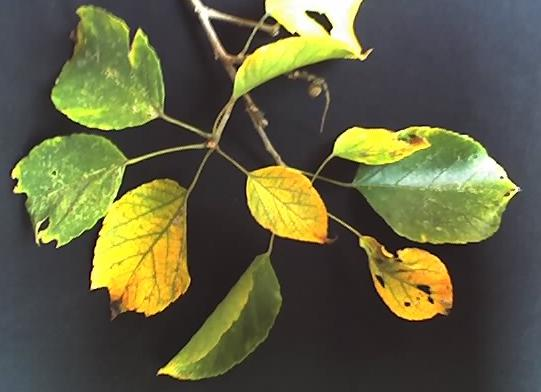
Foliated sprigs

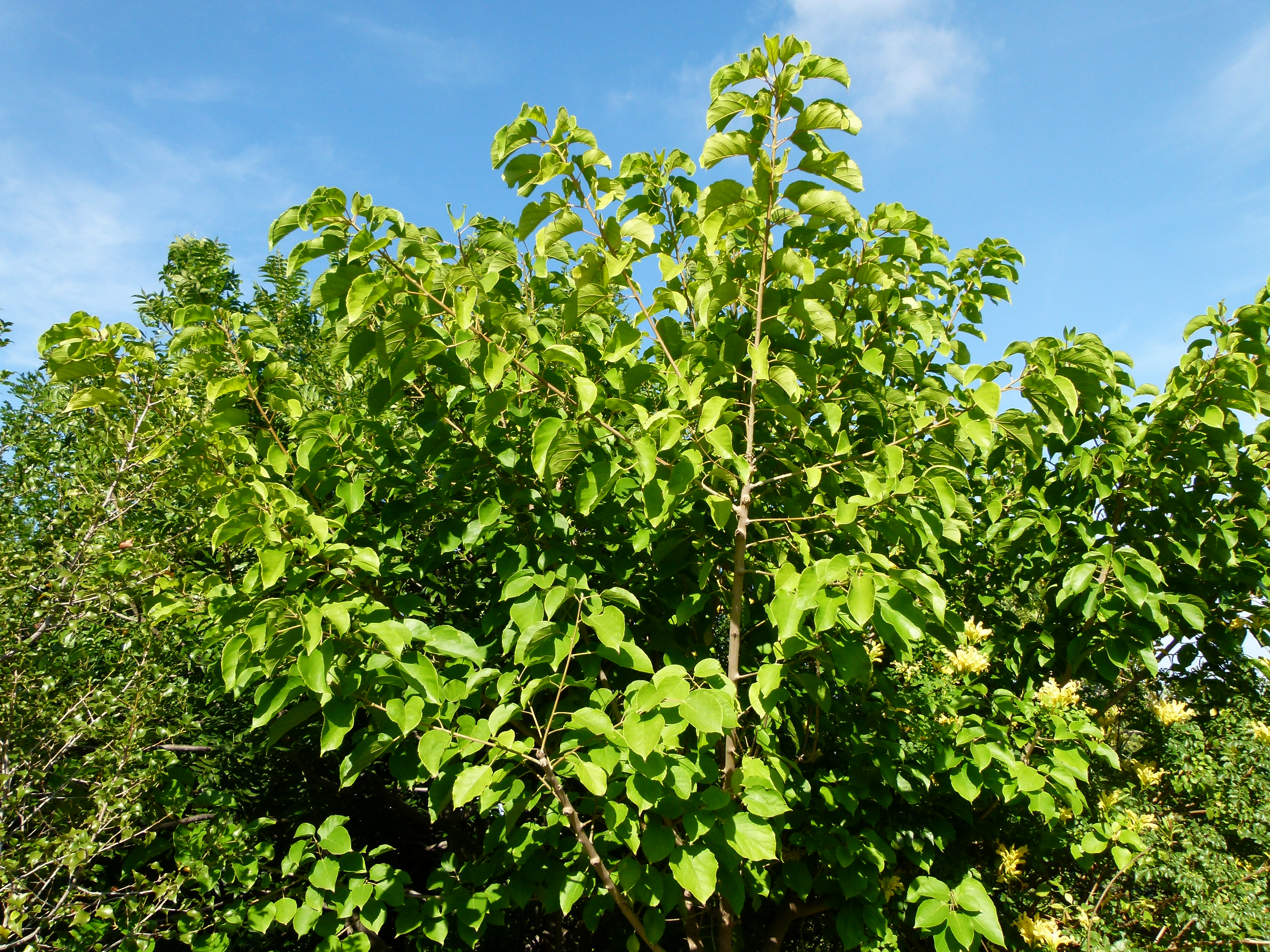
Crown

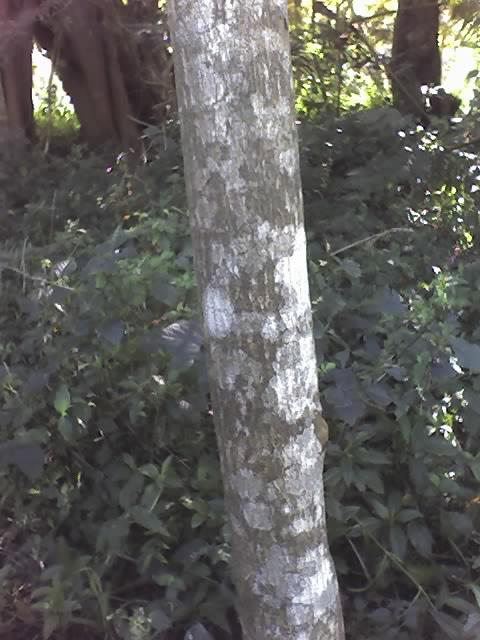
Young stem

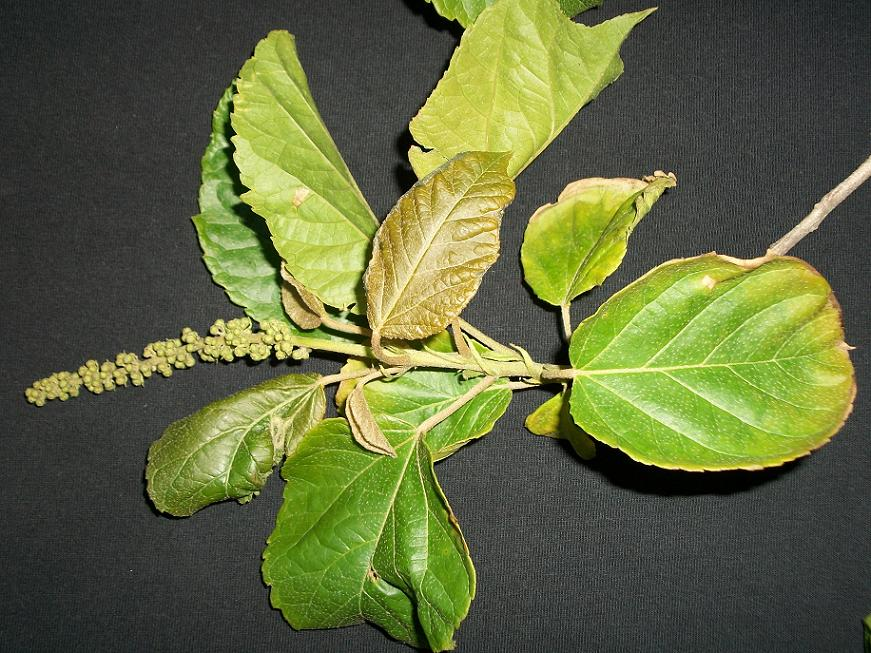
Flower buds on inflorescence

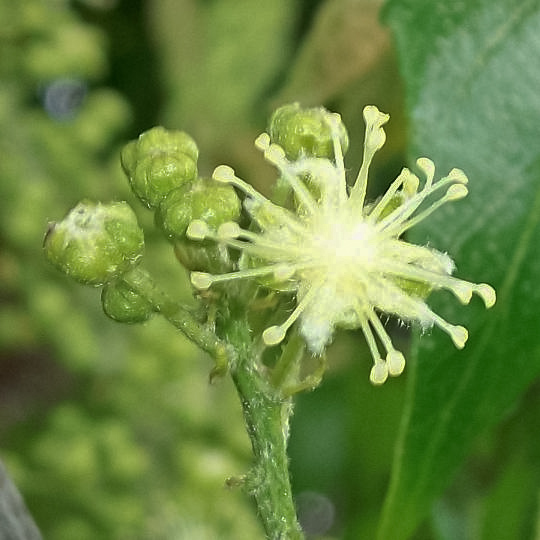
Flower

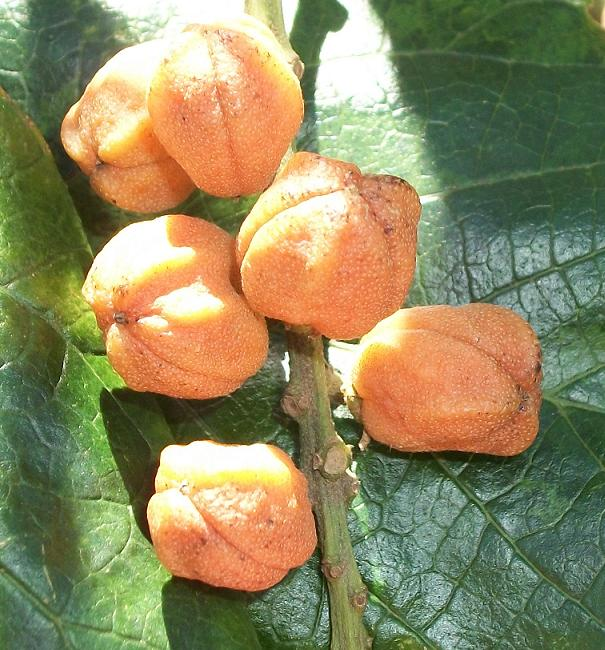
Fruit

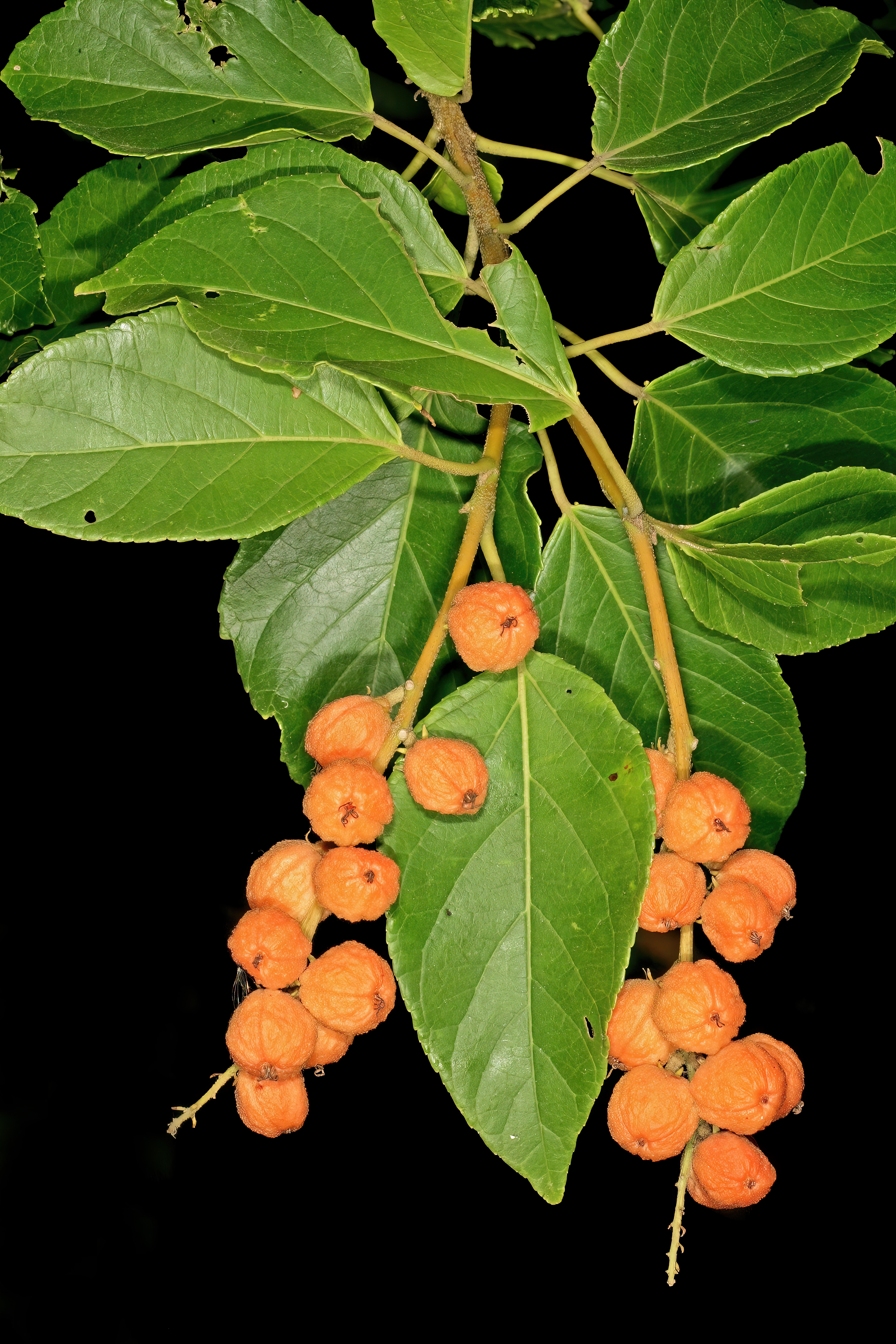
Fruit

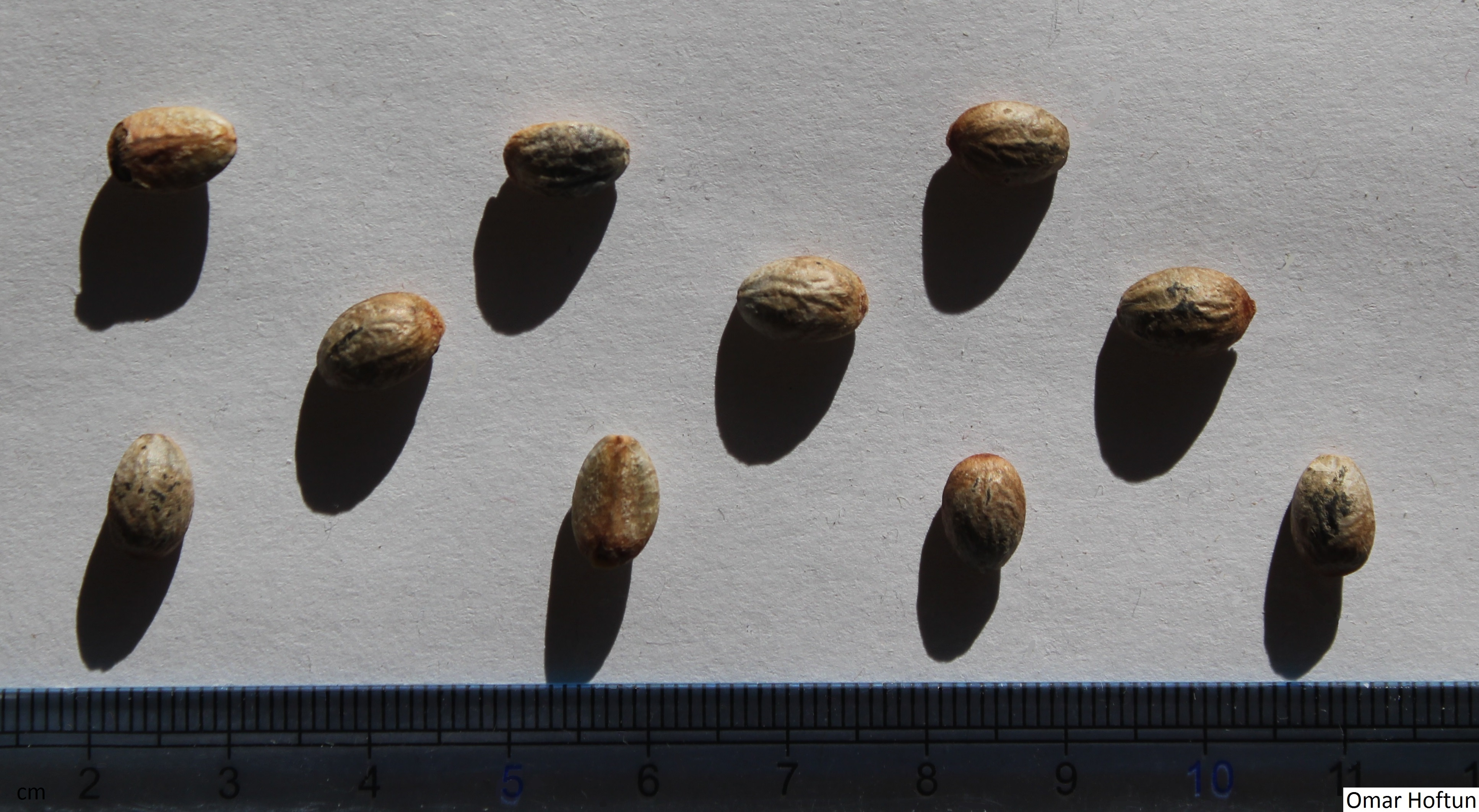
Seeds

== See also ==
- Forests of KwaZulu-Natal
