= Turquoise emperor =

Turquoise emperor may refer to:

- Apaturina erminea, an Old World butterfly
- Doxocopa laurentia, a New World butterfly
