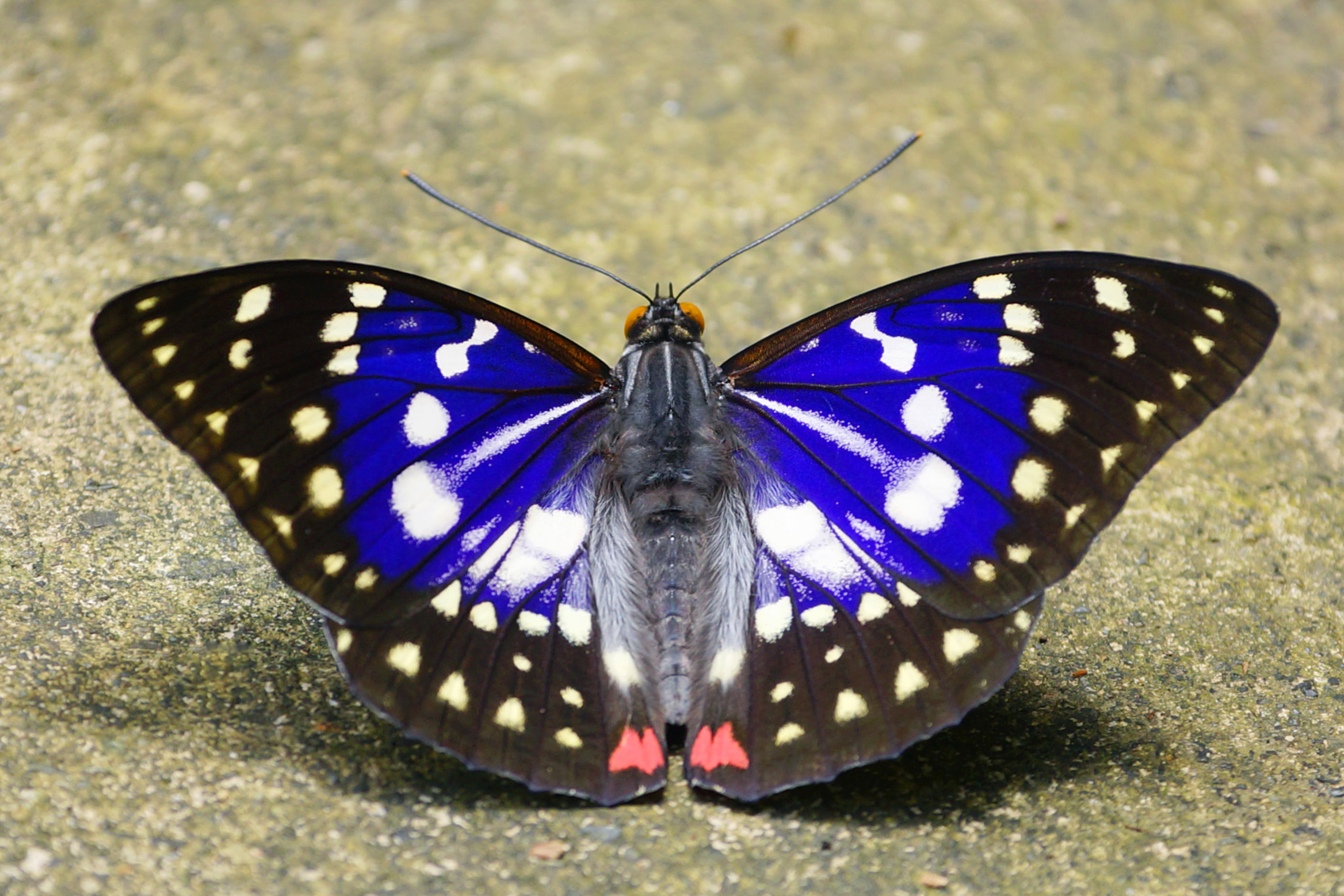
- Male
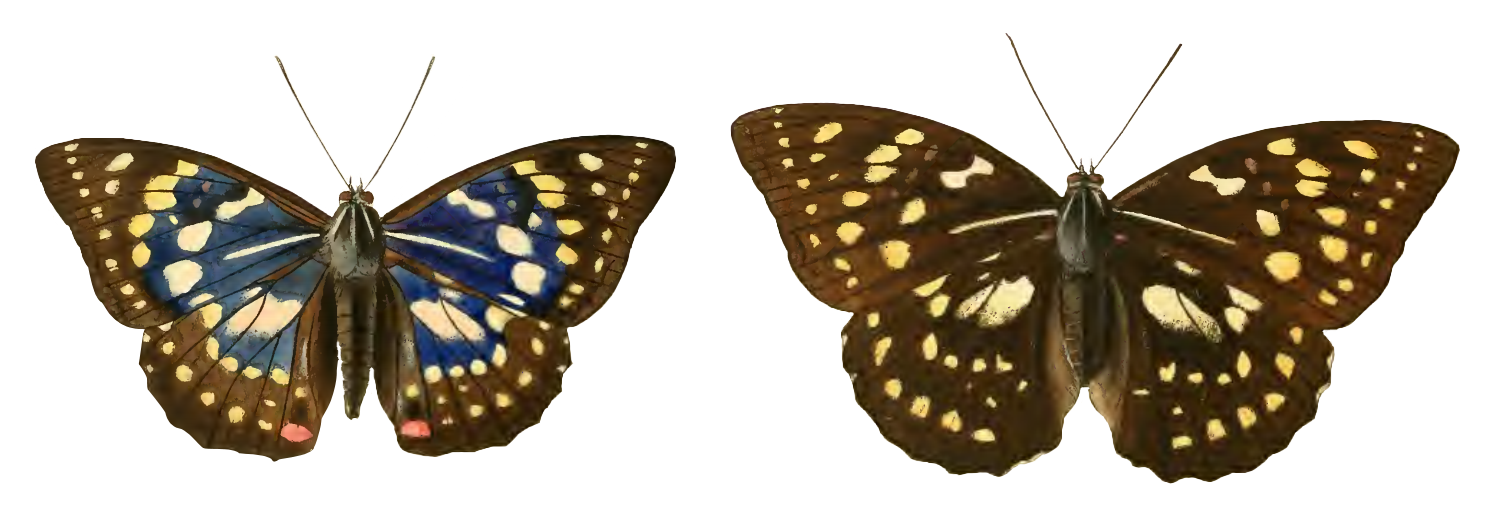
- Male (left) and female (right)

Scientific classification
- Kingdom: Animalia
- Phylum: Arthropoda
- Class: Insecta
- Order: Lepidoptera
- Family: Nymphalidae
- Subfamily: Apaturinae
- Genus: Sasakia
- Species: S. charonda

Binomial name
- Sasakia charonda (Hewitson, 1863)

Synonyms
- Diadema charonda Hewitson, 1863; Euripus coreanus Leech, 1887

= Sasakia charonda =

Great purple emperor

Species of butterfly

Sasakia charonda, the Japanese emperor or great purple emperor, is a species of butterfly in the family Nymphalidae. It is native to Japan (from Hokkaidō to Kyūshū), the Korean Peninsula, China, northern Taiwan and northern Vietnam. Its wingspan averages 50 mm (2.0 in) for males, and 65 mm (2.6 in) for females. They are common in the upper canopies of forests, only coming down to feed or to find salt sources. The larvae of the species feed on hackberries, like Celtis jessoensis, Celtis japonica and Celtis sinensis.

S. charonda is the national butterfly of Japan.

== See also ==
- List of butterflies of Taiwan
