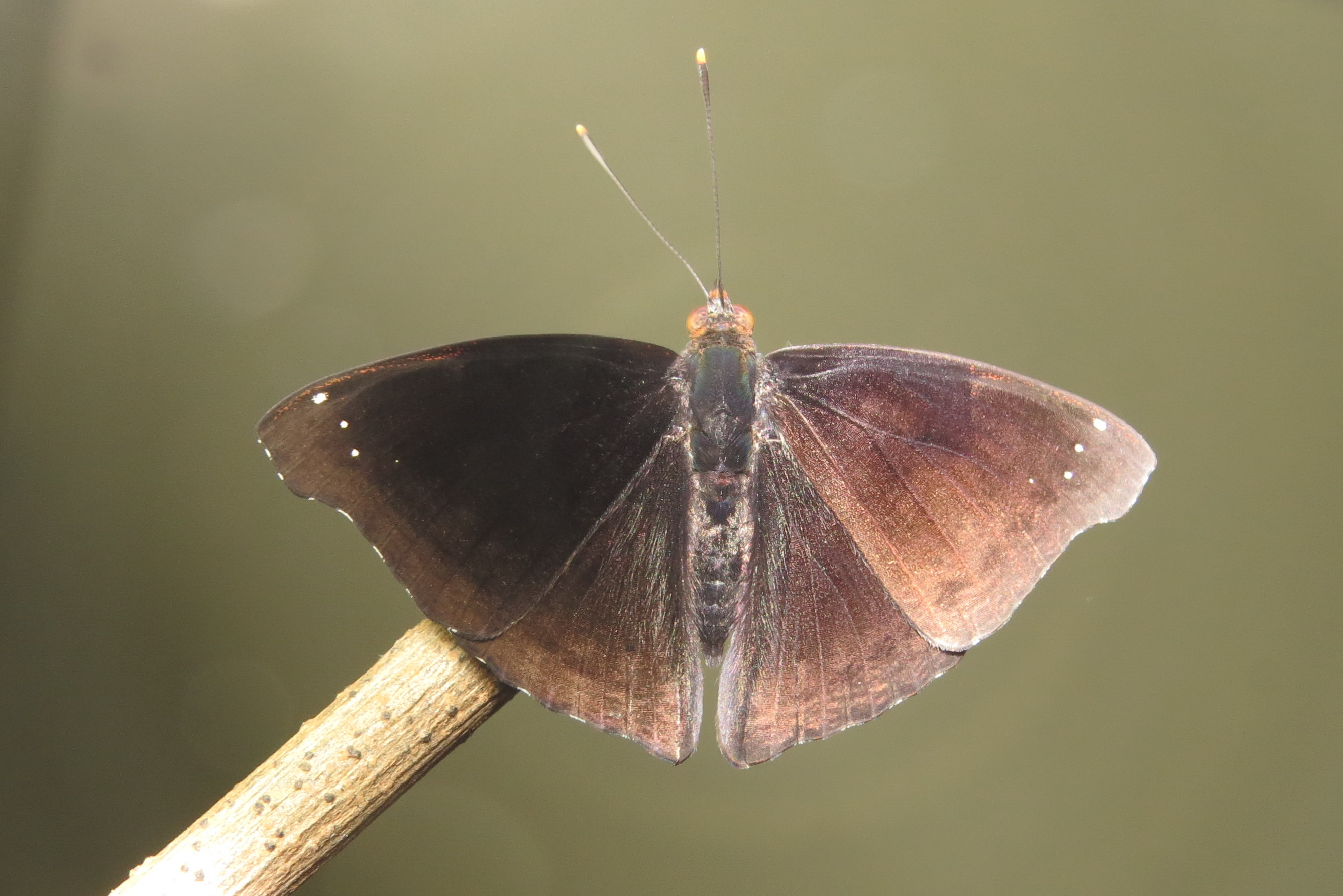
- Male
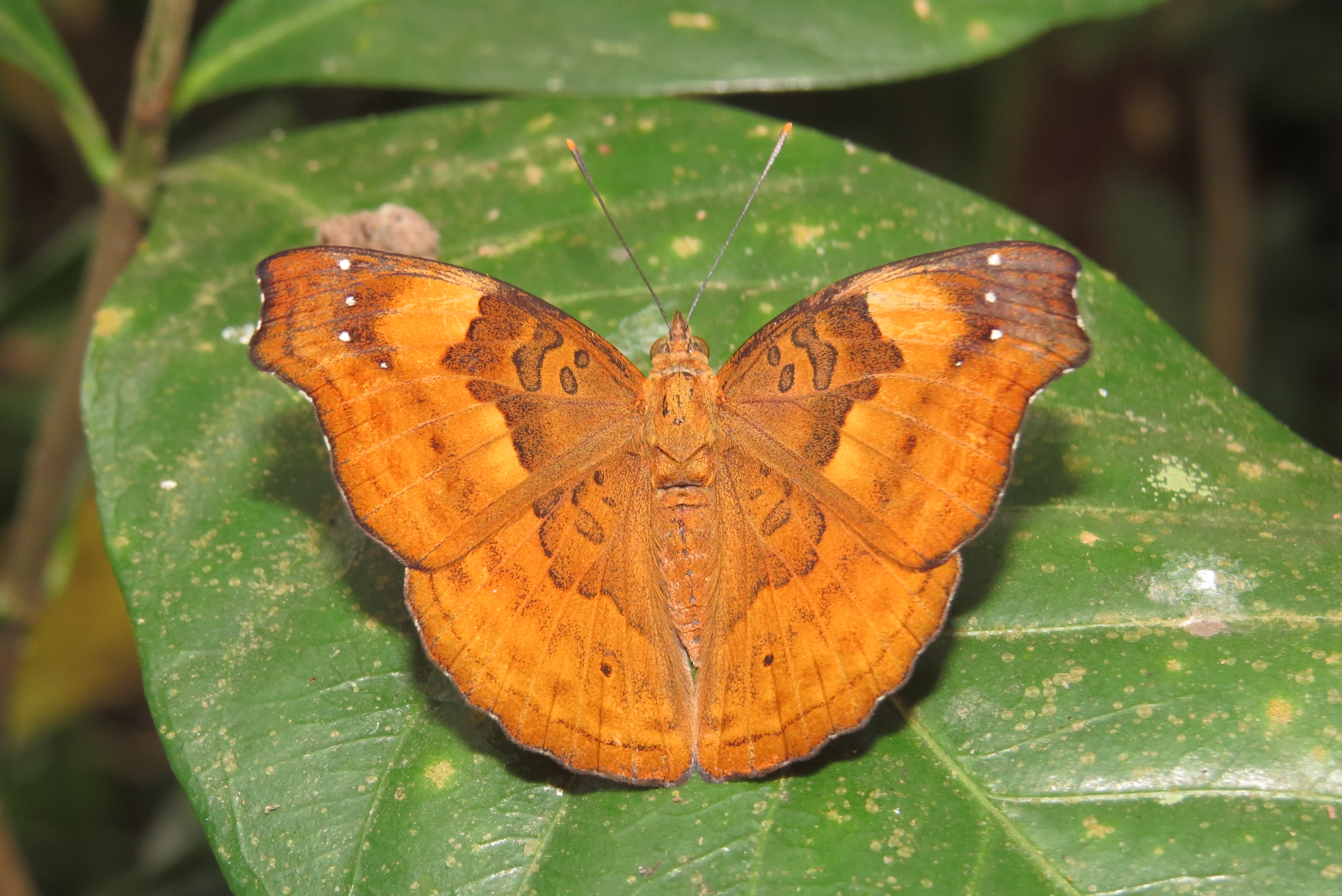
- Female

Scientific classification
- Kingdom: Animalia
- Phylum: Arthropoda
- Clade: Pancrustacea
- Class: Insecta
- Order: Lepidoptera
- Family: Nymphalidae
- Genus: Rohana
- Species: R. parisatis

Binomial name
- Rohana parisatis (Westwood, 1850)

Synonyms
- Apatura parisatis Westwood, 1850

= Rohana parisatis =

Black prince

Species of butterfly

Rohana parisatis, the black prince, is a species of butterfly of the family Nymphalidae found in Indomalayan realm.

== Description ==
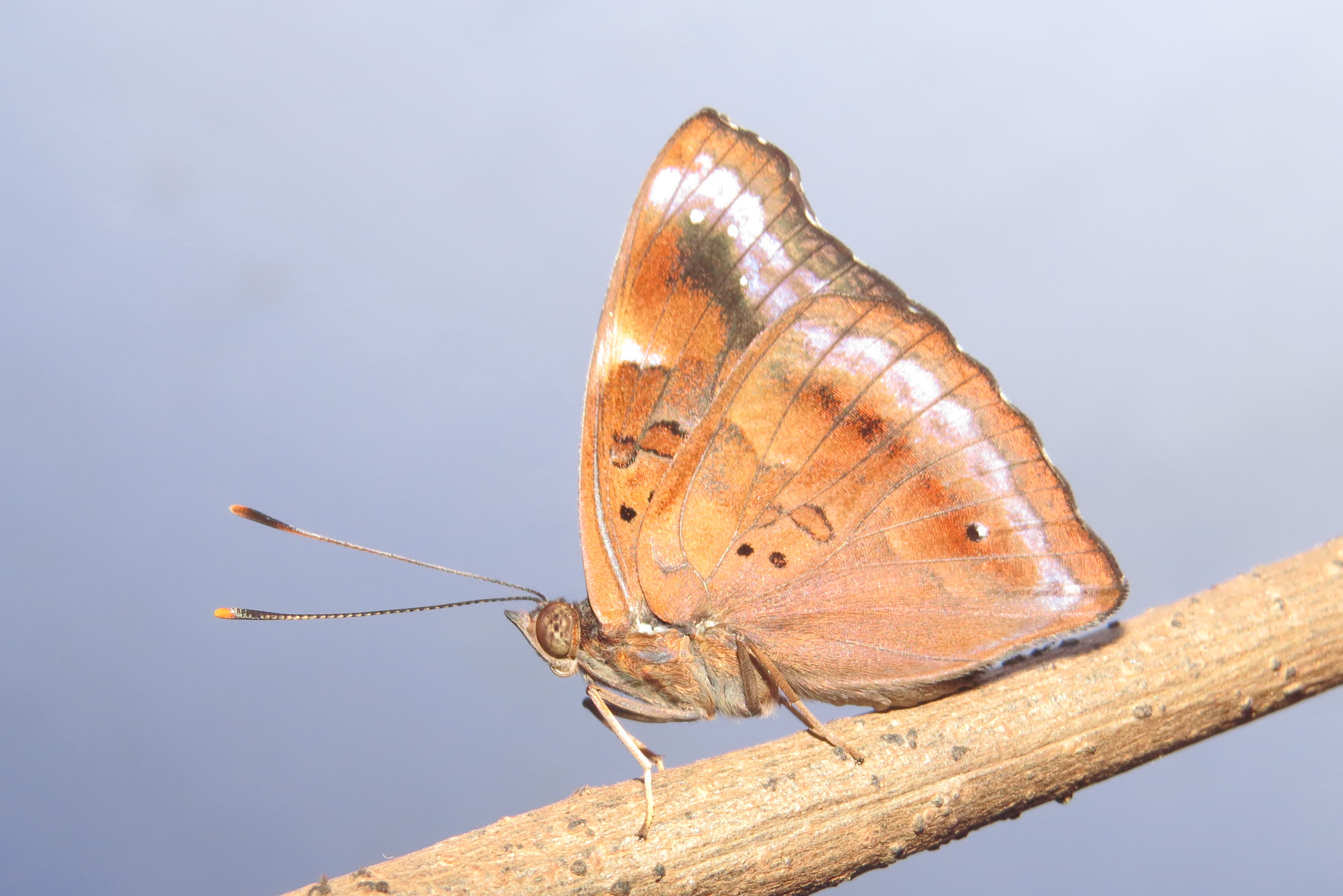
Underside (male)

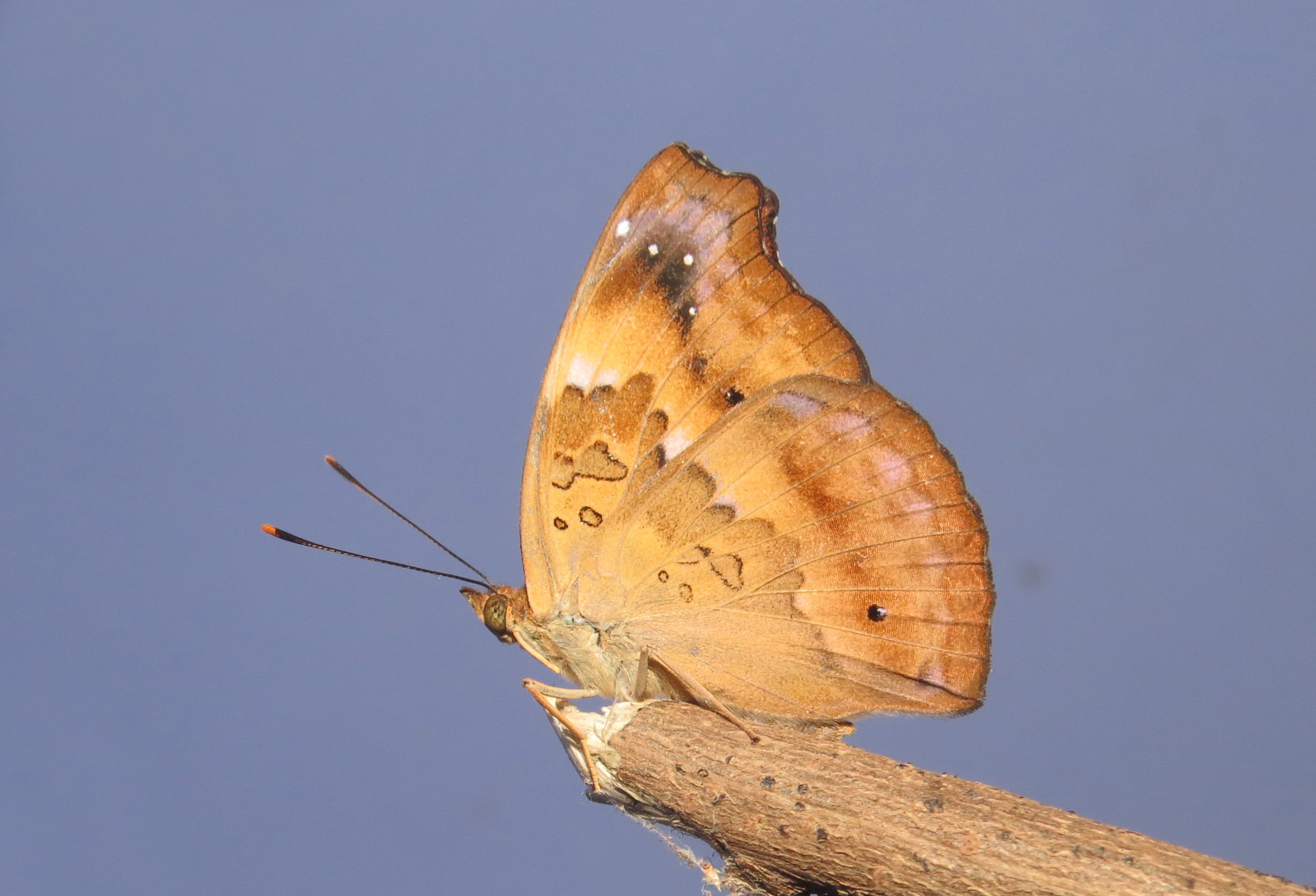
Underside (female)

Male upperside deep velvety black, with one minute snow-white preapical spot on the forewing; the cilia of both forewing and hindwing alternately black and white. Underside dark purplish brown, shaded at base of wings and along costal margin and apex of forewing with dark ferruginous; both forewing and hindwing with two black spots in the discoidal area, followed by an auriform mark and an irregular median band, crossing both wings, of dark brown, markings outwardly obscurely and interruptedly bordered with lilacine; beyond the discal area both wings are shaded transversely with dark brown, succeeded by a subterminal dark line bordered inwardly with purple; forewing with the white preapical spot larger; hindwing with a black white-centred minute subtornal spot. Antennae black; head, thorax and abdomen velvety black, dark brown beneath.

Female upperside yellowish brown. Forewings and hindwings: basal half shaded and marked with brown, with an angulated transverse broad brown median fascia and a postdiscal transverse brown shading; on the hindwing traversed by a series of obscure dark spots; on the hindwing traversed by a series of obscure dark spots; on the forewing with three, sometimes four, minute subapical white spots; a transverse series of dark lunular markings on both wings, followed by a subterminal dark line. Underside yellowish brown; markings somewhat similar to those in the male, but more clearly defined. Antennae head, thorax and abdomen light brown, yellowish beneath.

Race camiba, Moore of southern India and Sri Lanka, is absolutely identical except for the constant minute difference of the forewing on the upper and undersides; this has in the male three, in the female five subapical white dots.

== Larval Host Plants ==
Celtis

Celtis philippensis

Celtis timorensis

Celtis tetrandra

Celtis lycodoxylon
