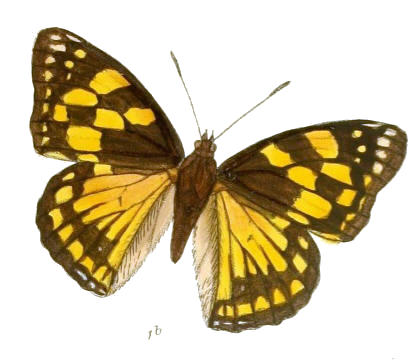
- Sephisa dichroa

Scientific classification
- Domain: Eukaryota
- Kingdom: Animalia
- Phylum: Arthropoda
- Class: Insecta
- Order: Lepidoptera
- Family: Nymphalidae
- Subfamily: Apaturinae
- Genus: Sephisa; Moore, 1882

= Sephisa =

Genus of brush-footed butterflies

Sephisa is a genus of butterflies in the family Nymphalidae. It is related to Apatura, Hestinalis, and Mimathyma, with a common ancestor that diverged around 30Ma.

== Species ==
- Sephisa dichroa (Kollar, [1844]) – western courtier
- Sephisa princeps (Fixsen, 1887)
- Sephisa chandra (Moore, [1858]) – eastern courtier
- Sephisa daimio Matsumura, 1910
