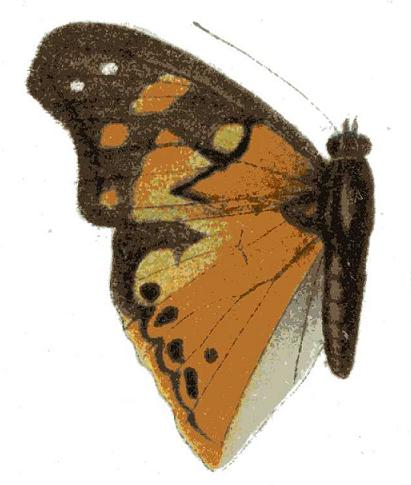

Scientific classification
- Kingdom: Animalia
- Phylum: Arthropoda
- Clade: Pancrustacea
- Class: Insecta
- Order: Lepidoptera
- Family: Nymphalidae
- Genus: Apaturopsis
- Species: A. cleochares

Binomial name
- Apaturopsis cleochares (Hewitson, 1873)

Synonyms
- Apatura cleochares Hewitson, 1873

= Apaturopsis cleochares =

Painted empress

Species of butterfly

Apaturopsis cleochares, the painted empress, is a butterfly in the family Nymphalidae. It is found in Guinea, Sierra Leone, Ivory Coast, Ghana, Nigeria, Cameroon, Gabon, Angola, the Central African Republic, the Democratic Republic of the Congo, Sudan, Uganda, Kenya, Tanzania, Malawi, Zimbabwe and Mozambique. The habitat consists of forests and heavy woodland.

Adults are attracted to fermenting bananas, excrement and other decaying matter. They are on wing from September to May.

The larvae possibly feed on Obetia tenax.

== Subspecies ==
- Apaturopsis cleochares cleochares (Guinea, Sierra Leone, Ivory Coast, Ghana, southern Nigeria, Cameroon, Gabon, Angola, Central African Republic, Democratic Republic of the Congo, southern Sudan, Uganda, western Kenya, north-western and northern Tanzania)
- Apaturopsis cleochares schultzei Schmidt, 1921 (central Kenya, Malawi, eastern Zimbabwe, Mozambique, Tanzania: Usambara Mountains)

Torben Larsen developed a species numbering system for his 2005 publication Butterflies of West Africa. The nominate subspecies is #786. The 'Larsen' numbers have since been used with permission in A Sharp Eye on Butterflies of Ghana.
