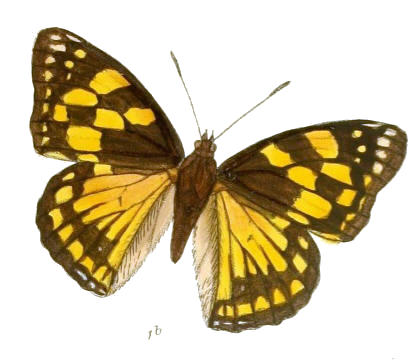

Scientific classification
- Domain: Eukaryota
- Kingdom: Animalia
- Phylum: Arthropoda
- Class: Insecta
- Order: Lepidoptera
- Family: Nymphalidae
- Genus: Sephisa
- Species: S. chandra

Binomial name
- Sephisa chandra (Kollar, 1844)

= Sephisa dichroa =

Western courtier

Species of butterfly

Sephisa dichroa, the western courtier, is a species of nymphalid butterfly found in South and Southeast Asia. In South Asia, they are found along the Himalayas.
