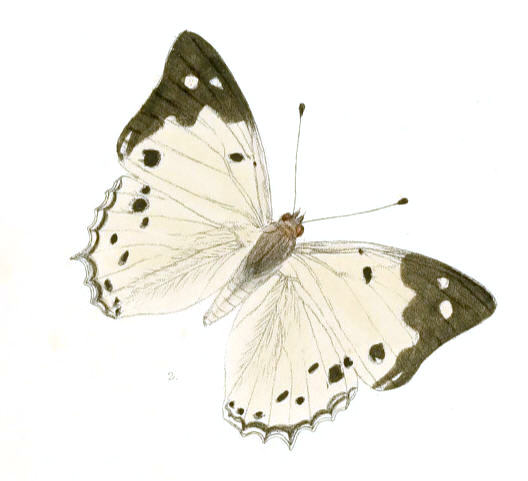
- Helcyra hemina

Scientific classification
- Domain: Eukaryota
- Kingdom: Animalia
- Phylum: Arthropoda
- Class: Insecta
- Order: Lepidoptera
- Family: Nymphalidae
- Subfamily: Apaturinae
- Genus: Helcyra; Felder, 1860

= Helcyra =

Genus of brush-footed butterflies

Helcyra is a genus of butterflies in the family Nymphalidae.

== Species ==
- Helcyra chionippe Felder, 1860 New Guinea
- Helcyra superba Leech, 1890 China
- Helcyra hemina Hewitson, 1864 – white emperor
- Helcyra plesseni (Fruhstorfer, 1913) Taiwan
- Helcyra miyamotoi Koiwaya, 2003
- Helcyra subalba (Poujade, 1885) China
- Helcyra celebensis Martin, 1913 – Sulawesi white emperor
