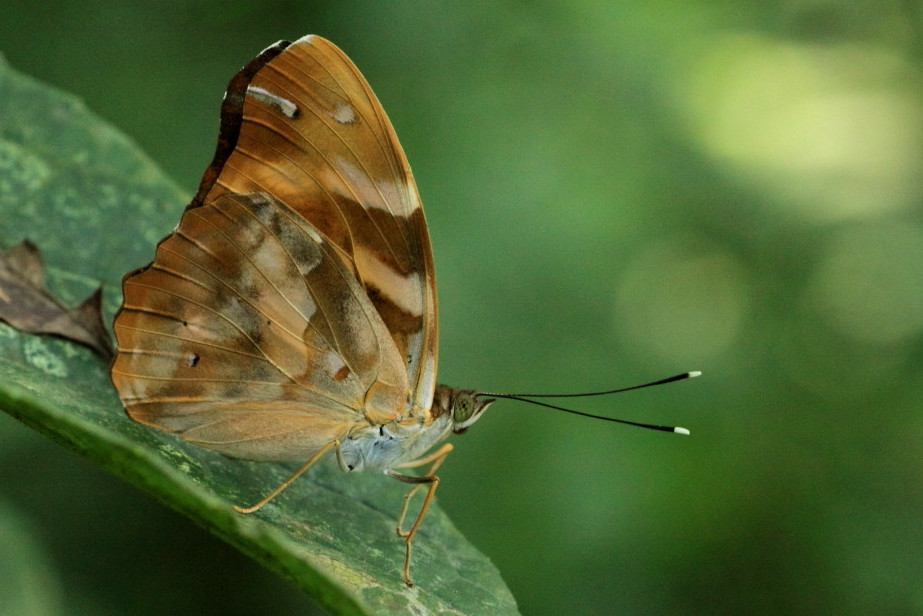

Scientific classification
- Kingdom: Animalia
- Phylum: Arthropoda
- Clade: Pancrustacea
- Class: Insecta
- Order: Lepidoptera
- Family: Nymphalidae
- Genus: Herona
- Species: H. marathus

Binomial name
- Herona marathus (Doubleday, 1848)

Synonyms
- Herona angustata

= Herona marathus =

Pasha

Species of butterfly

Herona marathus, the pasha is a species of nymphalid butterfly found in India.

== Description ==
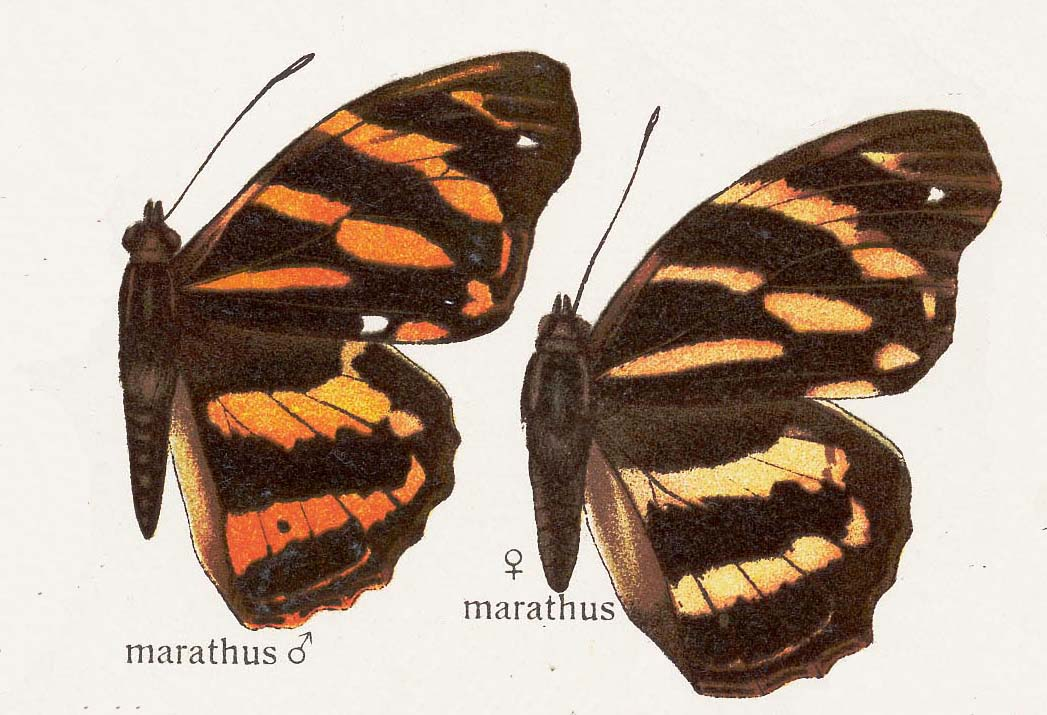

The adults are dark brown above with two yellow or white discal bands on forewing and hindwing. They have a basal streak in vein 1b of forewing. Underside of forewing, in vein 5 with white streak in outer half till the termen.

== Habits ==
It is fairly common up to 4000 ft (1200 m) in the Sikkim-Darjeeling area. Most frequent between 2000 and 3000 ft (600–900 m). It is very fond of over-ripe fruits. Visits damp patches for puddling. According to Haribal (1992), when disturbed it sits with head down and wings close to tree trunks and thus perfectly camouflaged. Very difficult to catch/locate in this stage. Haribal (1992) saw it in Chungthang and Mangan area of Sikkim.

== Taxonomy ==
Two subspecies are recorded in India:

- H. m. marathus Doubleday Wingspan 70–90 mm. Above bands tawny, very wide and confluent. It lives from Sikkim to eastwards.
- H. m. angustata Moore. Above bands tawny, narrow. Discal bands on hindwing and outer band on forewing macular. Bands in males whitish while in female white. It lives in the Andamans.

== Status ==
The nominate subspecies is not rare (Evans, 1932).

== See also ==
- Nymphalidae
- List of butterflies of India (Nymphalidae)
