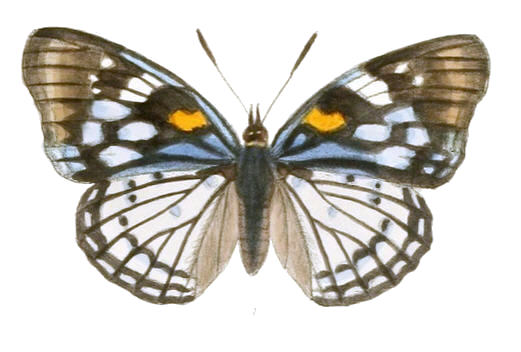

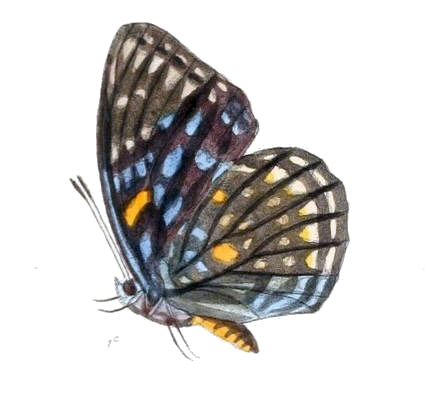

Scientific classification
- Domain: Eukaryota
- Kingdom: Animalia
- Phylum: Arthropoda
- Class: Insecta
- Order: Lepidoptera
- Family: Nymphalidae
- Genus: Sephisa
- Species: S. chandra

Binomial name
- Sephisa chandra Moore, 1858

= Sephisa chandra =

Easter courtier

Species of butterfly

Sephisa chandra, the eastern courtier, is a species of nymphalid butterfly found in South and Southeast Asia.

== Gallery ==
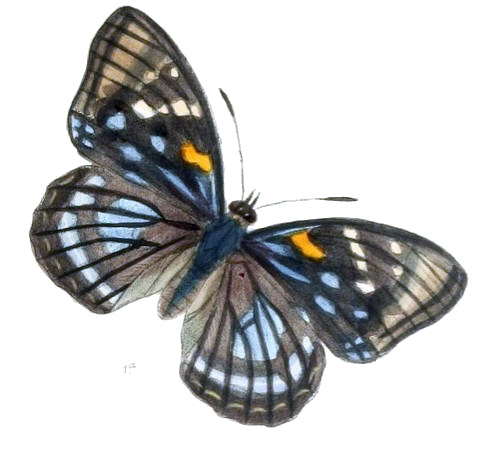

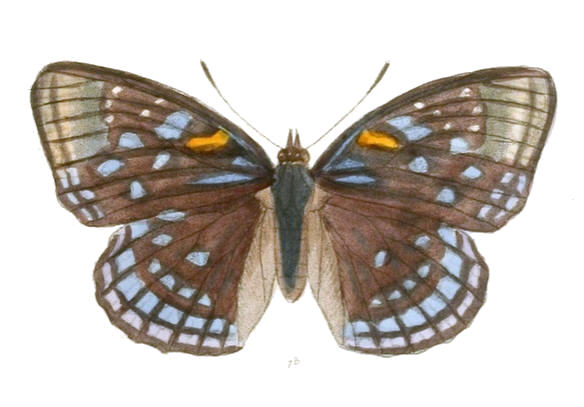

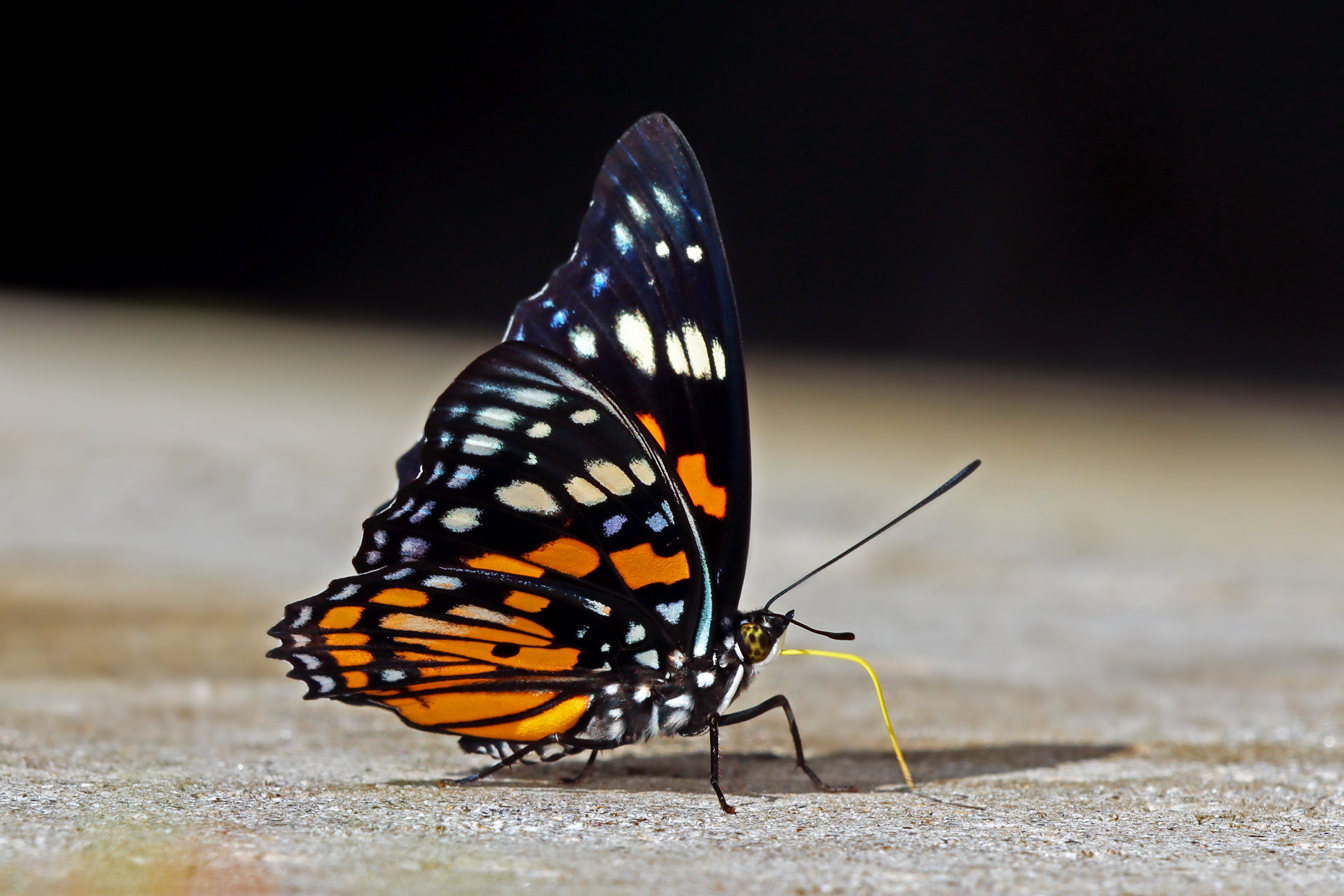

== Notes ==
- "Sephisa Moore, 1882" at Markku Savela's Lepidoptera and Some Other Life Forms
