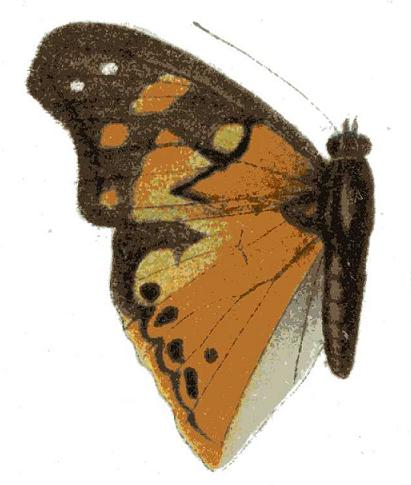
- Apaturopsis cleochares

Scientific classification
- Domain: Eukaryota
- Kingdom: Animalia
- Phylum: Arthropoda
- Class: Insecta
- Order: Lepidoptera
- Family: Nymphalidae
- Subfamily: Apaturinae
- Genus: Apaturopsis; Aurivillius, 1898

= Apaturopsis =

Genus of brush-footed butterflies

Apaturopsis is a genus of butterflies in the family Nymphalidae.

== Species ==
- Apaturopsis cleochares (Hewitson, 1873) – painted empress
- Apaturopsis kilusa (Grose-Smith, 1891)
- Apaturopsis paulianii Viette, 1962
