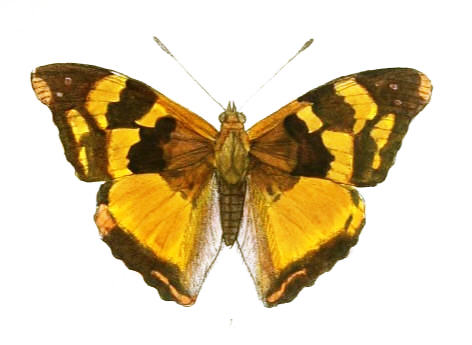
- Dilipa morgiana

Scientific classification
- Domain: Eukaryota
- Kingdom: Animalia
- Phylum: Arthropoda
- Class: Insecta
- Order: Lepidoptera
- Family: Nymphalidae
- Subfamily: Apaturinae
- Genus: Dilipa; Moore, 1857

= Dilipa =

Genus of brush-footed butterflies

Dilipa is a genus of butterflies in the family Nymphalidae.

== Species ==
- Dilipa fenestra (Leech, 1891)
- Dilipa morgiana (Westwood, [1850]) – golden emperor
