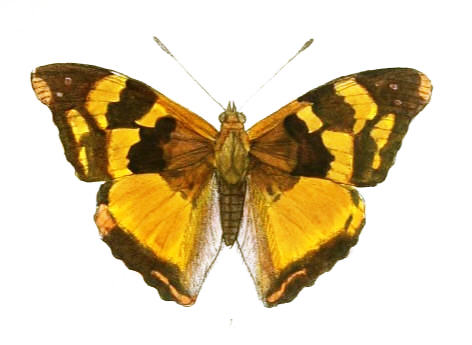

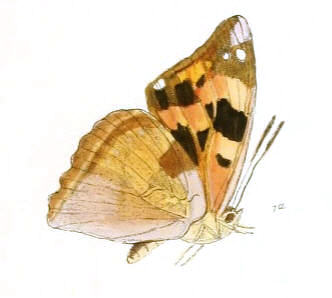

Scientific classification
- Domain: Eukaryota
- Kingdom: Animalia
- Phylum: Arthropoda
- Class: Insecta
- Order: Lepidoptera
- Family: Nymphalidae
- Genus: Dilipa
- Species: D. morgiana

Binomial name
- Dilipa morgiana (Westwood, [1850])

Synonyms
- Apatura morgiana Westwood, [1850]

= Dilipa morgiana =

Species of butterfly

Dilipa morgiana, the golden emperor, is a species of butterfly of the family Nymphalidae. It is found in India (Arunachal Pradesh, Assam, Himachal Pradesh, Jammu and Kashmir, Nagaland, Sikkim, Uttaranchal), Nepal, northern Myanmar and Vietnam.

The wingspan is 70–82 mm. There are three generations per year, with adults on wing in March, June and from August to October.

Adults visit over-ripe fruits like apricot, peach and mango and are attracted to Buddleia blossoms.

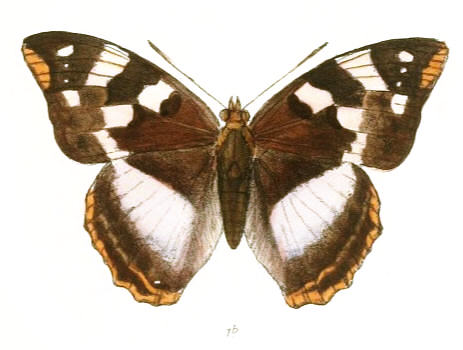

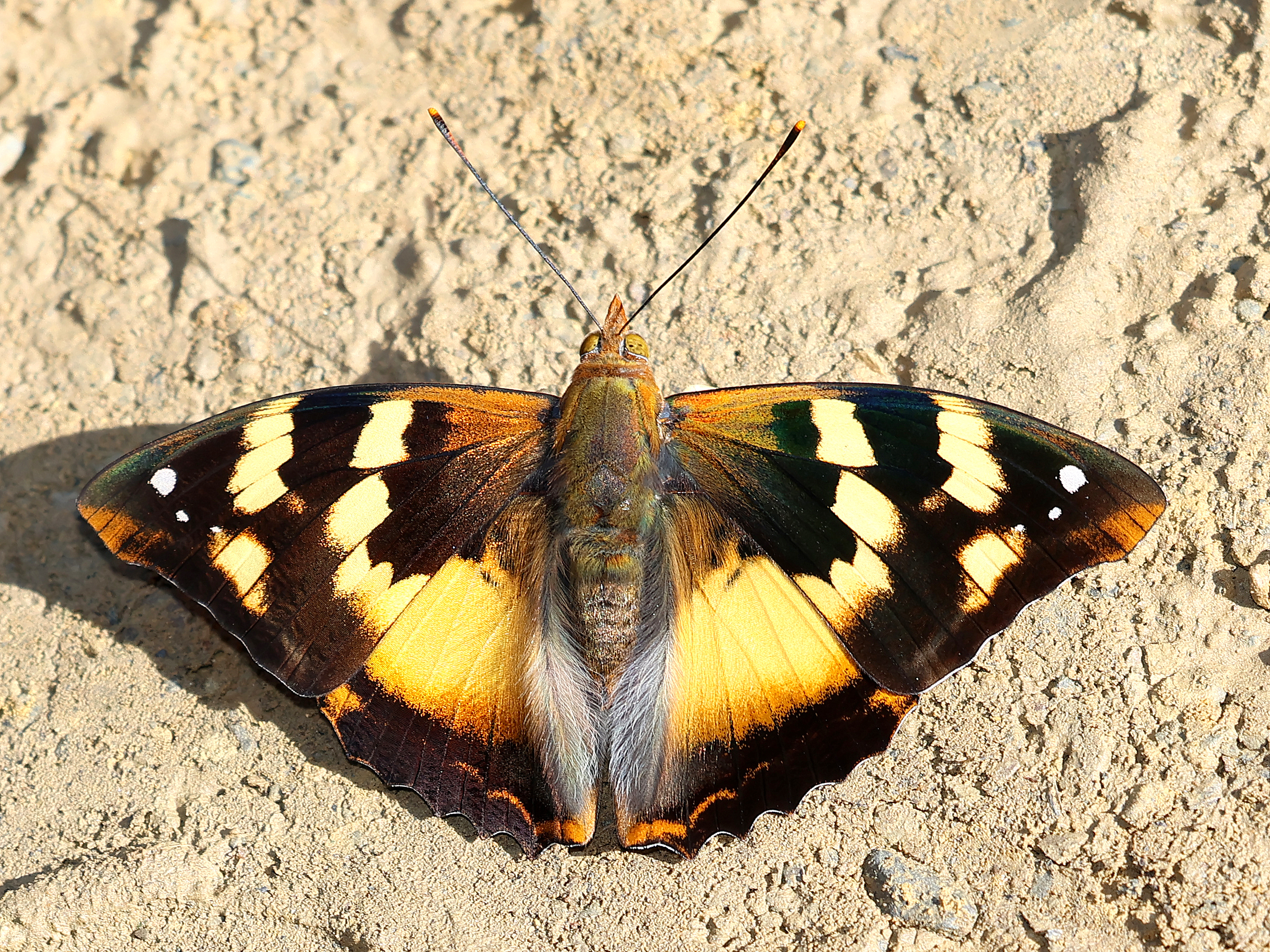

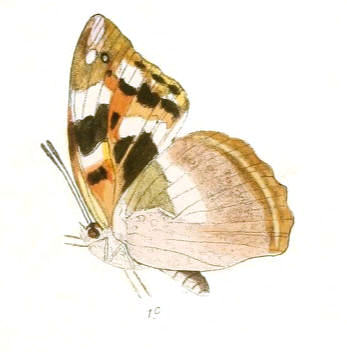

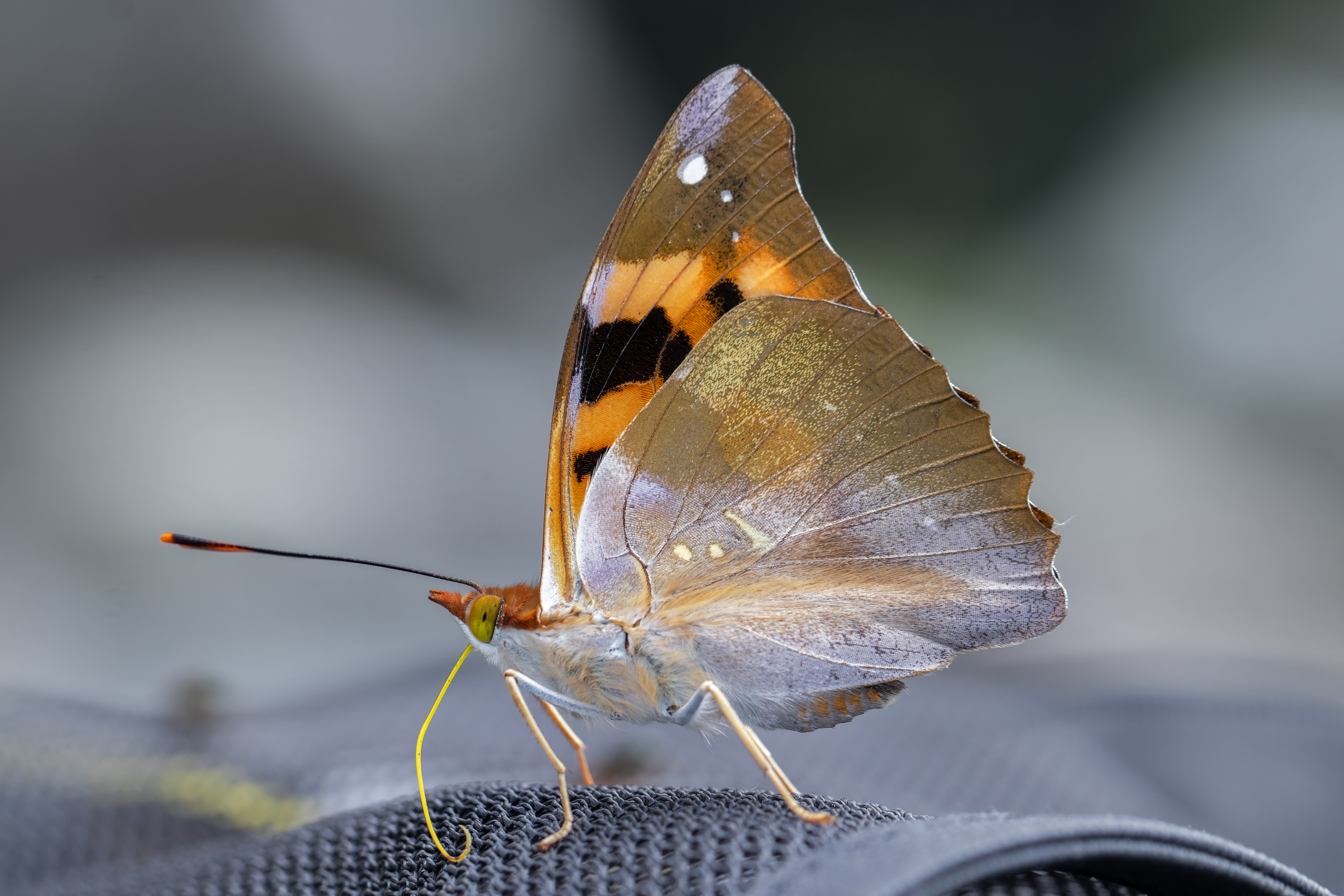
