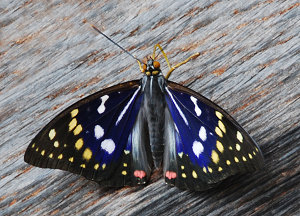
- Sasakia charonda

Scientific classification
- Domain: Eukaryota
- Kingdom: Animalia
- Phylum: Arthropoda
- Class: Insecta
- Order: Lepidoptera
- Family: Nymphalidae
- Subfamily: Apaturinae
- Genus: Sasakia; Moore, [1896]

Type species
- Diadema charonda Hewitson, 1863

= Sasakia =

Genus of brush-footed butterflies

Sasakia is a genus of butterflies in the subfamily Apaturinae of the family Nymphalidae.

== Species ==
- Sasakia charonda (Hewitson, 1863)
- Sasakia funebris (Leech, 1891) – empress
- Sasakia pulcherrima Chou & Li
