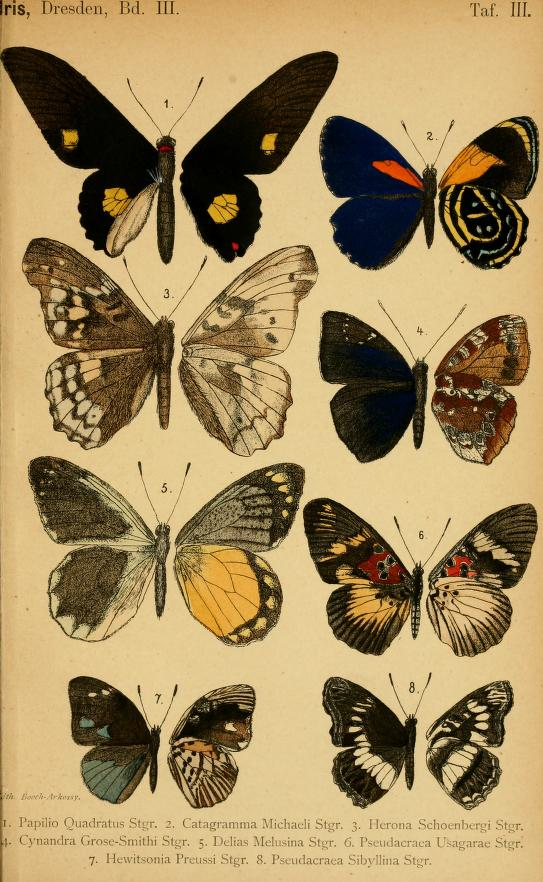
- Fig. 3 Herona sumatrana subspecies schoenbergi

Scientific classification
- Domain: Eukaryota
- Kingdom: Animalia
- Phylum: Arthropoda
- Class: Insecta
- Order: Lepidoptera
- Family: Nymphalidae
- Subfamily: Apaturinae
- Genus: Herona; Doubleday, 1848

= Herona =

Genus of brush-footed butterflies

Herona is a genus of butterflies in the family Nymphalidae.

== Species ==
- Herona marathus Doubleday, [1848] – pasha
- Herona sumatrana Moore, 1881
