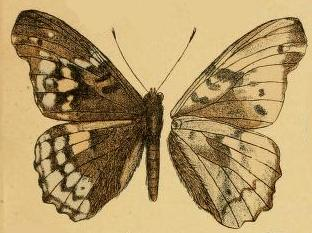

Scientific classification
- Kingdom: Animalia
- Phylum: Arthropoda
- Clade: Pancrustacea
- Class: Insecta
- Order: Lepidoptera
- Family: Nymphalidae
- Genus: Herona
- Species: H. sumatrana

Binomial name
- Herona sumatrana Moore, 1881

Synonyms
- Herona dusuntua Corbet, 1937; Herona schoenbergi Staudinger, 1890; Herona schoenbergi Staudinger, 1891; Herona djarang Fruhstorfer, 1893; Herona pringondani Fruhstorfer, 1893

= Herona sumatrana =

Species of butterfly

Herona sumatrana, the White Pasha, is a species of butterfly in the family Nymphalidae. It is found in South-East Asia.

== Subspecies ==
- Herona sumatrana sumatrana (Sumatra)
- Herona sumatrana dusuntua Corbet, 1937 (Peninsular Malaya)
- Herona sumatrana schoenbergi Staudinger, 1890 (Borneo)
- Herona sumatrana djarang Fruhstorfer, 1893 (Nias)
- Herona sumatrana pringondani Fruhstorfer, 1893 (Java and possibly Bali)
