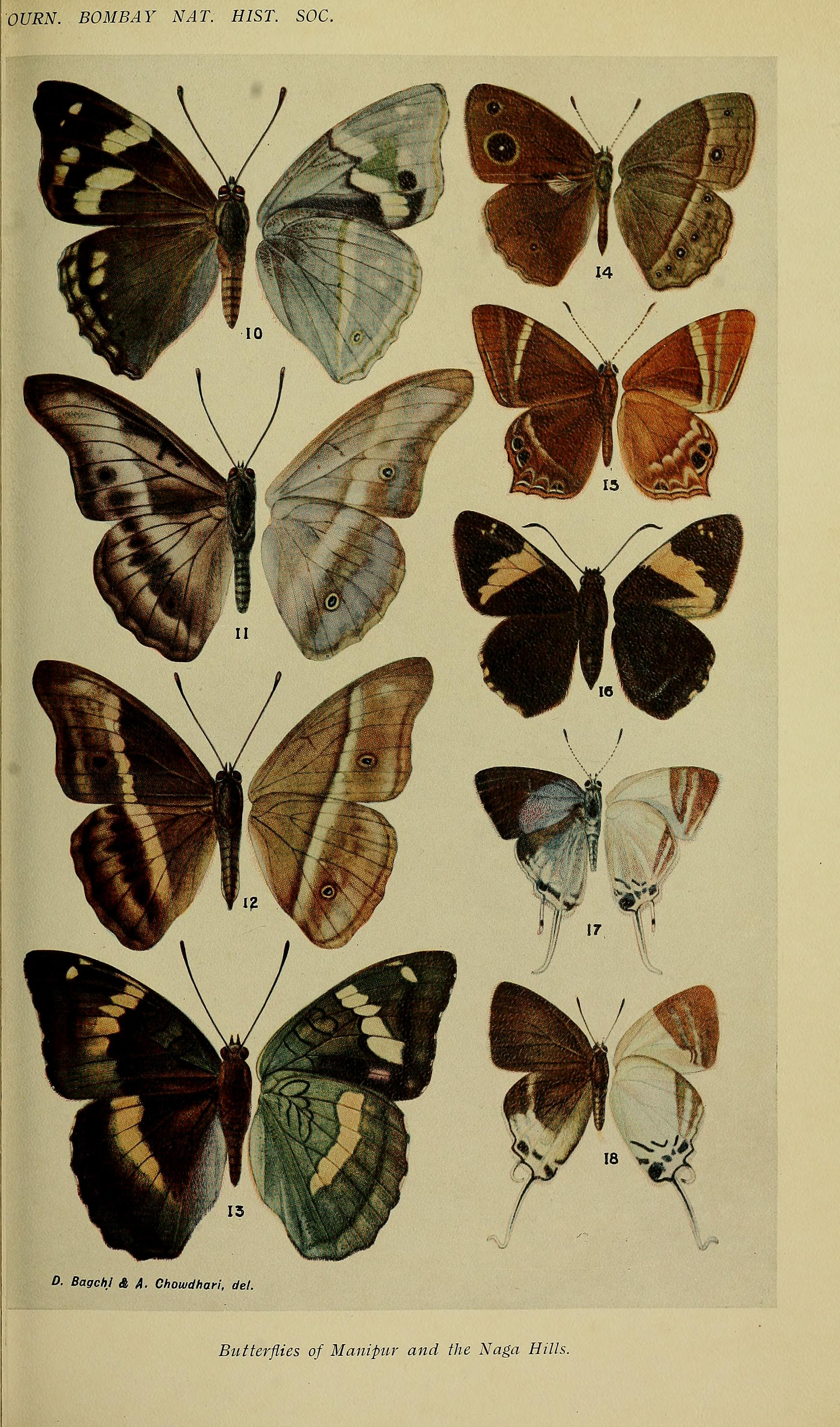
- Eulaceura manipuriensis 11 male, 12 female – plate accompanying the original description

Scientific classification
- Domain: Eukaryota
- Kingdom: Animalia
- Phylum: Arthropoda
- Class: Insecta
- Order: Lepidoptera
- Family: Nymphalidae
- Genus: Eulaceura
- Species: E. manipuriensis

Binomial name
- Eulaceura manipuriensis (Tytler, 1915)

= Eulaceura manipuriensis =

Species of butterfly

Eulaceura manipuriensis, or Tytler's emperor, is an Indomalayan butterfly of the family Nymphalidae. The species was first described by Harry Tytler in 1915. It is endemic to the Indian state of Manipur.
