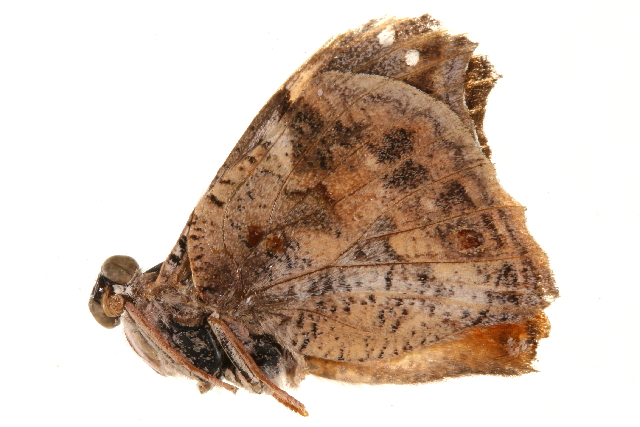

Scientific classification
- Domain: Eukaryota
- Kingdom: Animalia
- Phylum: Arthropoda
- Class: Insecta
- Order: Lepidoptera
- Family: Nymphalidae
- Genus: Apaturopsis
- Species: A. paulianii

Binomial name
- Apaturopsis paulianii Viette, 1962

= Apaturopsis paulianii =

Species of butterfly

Apaturopsis paulianii is a butterfly in the family Nymphalidae. It is found on Madagascar. The habitat consists of forests.
