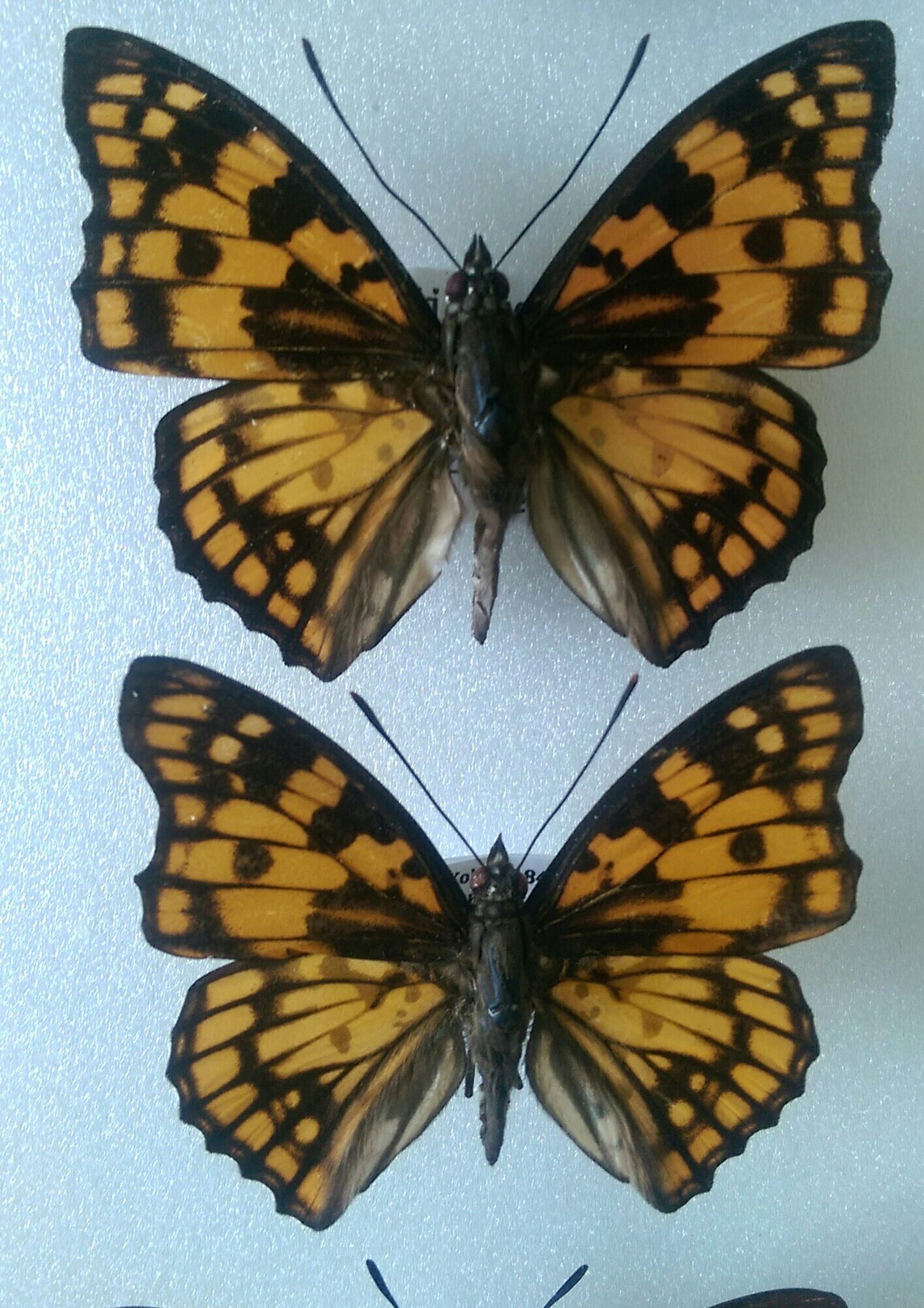

Scientific classification
- Domain: Eukaryota
- Kingdom: Animalia
- Phylum: Arthropoda
- Class: Insecta
- Order: Lepidoptera
- Family: Nymphalidae
- Genus: Sephisa
- Species: S. princeps

Binomial name
- Sephisa princeps (Fixsen, 1887)

Synonyms
- Apatura princeps Fixsen, 1887; Sephisa dichroa princeps Fixsen, 1887; Apatura cauta Leech, 1887; Sephisa princeps var. albimacula Leech, 1890

= Sephisa princeps =

Species of butterfly

Sephisa princeps is a species of butterfly of the family Nymphalidae. It was described by Johann Heinrich Fixsen in 1887. It is found in the Russian Far East (Amur, Ussuri), north-eastern China and Korea. The habitat consists of oak forests.

== Behaviour and ecology ==
Adults are on wing from July to August.

The larvae feed on Quercus mongolica. Larvae of first two instars live gregariously. There are a total of five instars.

== Subspecies ==
- Sephisa princeps princeps
- Sephisa princeps tsekouensis Nguyen, 1984 (China: Yunnan)
- Sephisa princeps chinensis Nguyen, 1984 (China: Hupei)
