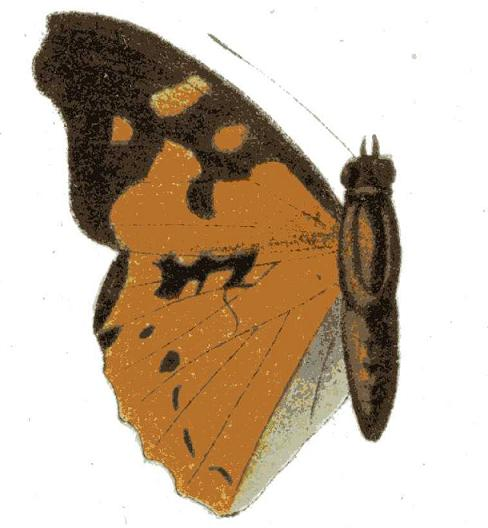

Scientific classification
- Domain: Eukaryota
- Kingdom: Animalia
- Phylum: Arthropoda
- Class: Insecta
- Order: Lepidoptera
- Family: Nymphalidae
- Genus: Apaturopsis
- Species: A. kilusa

Binomial name
- Apaturopsis kilusa (Grose-Smith, 1891)

Synonyms
- Thaleropis kilusa Grose-Smith, 1891

= Apaturopsis kilusa =

Species of butterfly

Apaturopsis kilusa is a butterfly in the family Nymphalidae. It is found in north-western Madagascar. The habitat consists of forests.
