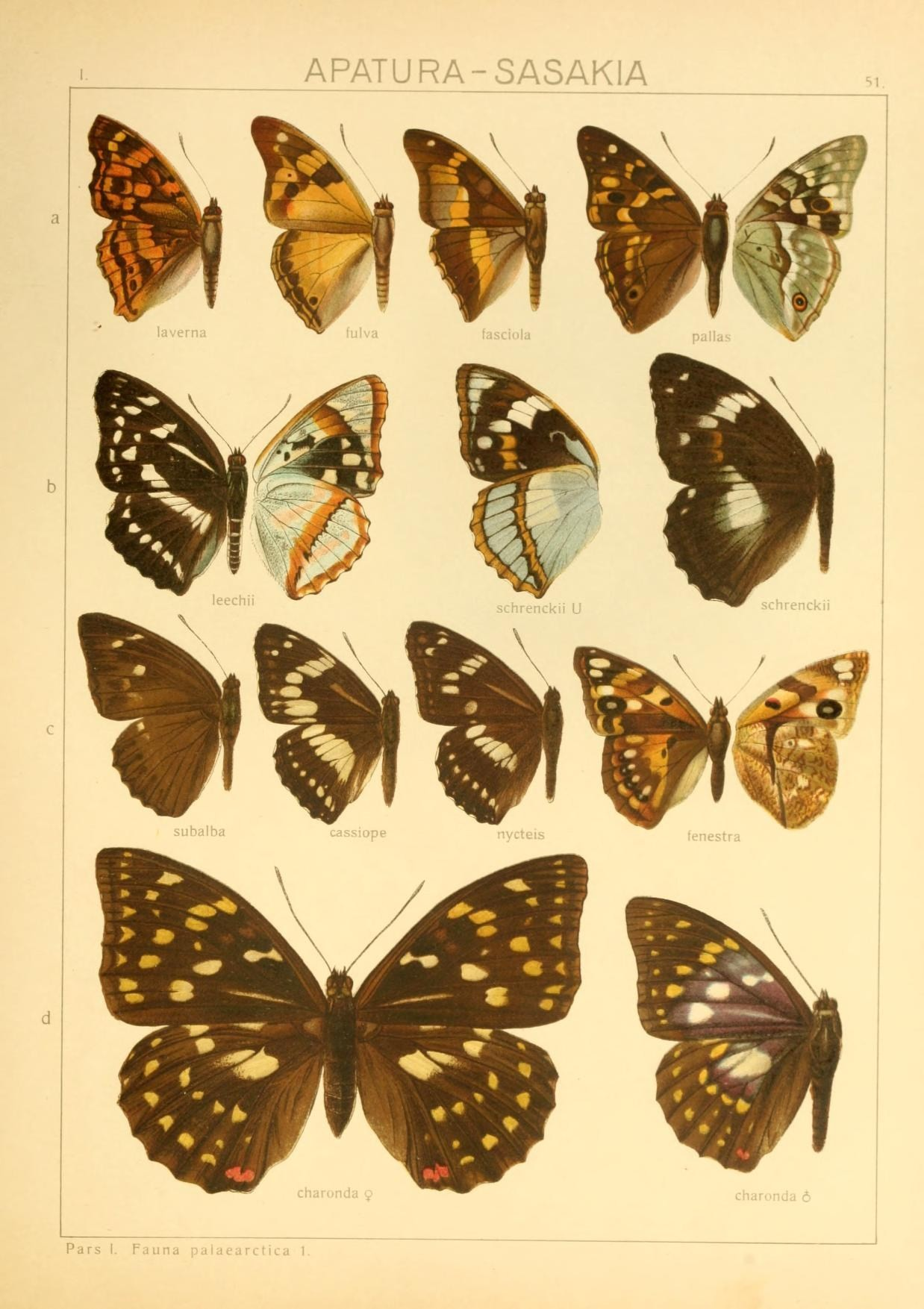
- Dilipa fenestra in Seitz 51c

Scientific classification
- Domain: Eukaryota
- Kingdom: Animalia
- Phylum: Arthropoda
- Class: Insecta
- Order: Lepidoptera
- Family: Nymphalidae
- Genus: Dilipa
- Species: D. fenestra

Binomial name
- Dilipa fenestra (Leech, 1891)

= Dilipa fenestra =

Species of butterfly

Dilipa fenestra is a butterfly found in the East Palearctic (East China, Northeast China, Korea) that belongs to the browns family.

== Description from Seitz ==
D. fenestra Leech ( = Apatura chrysus Oberth.) (51c) is a singular species, red-brown being its prevailing ground-colour. In the male the forewing dusted with blackish in the basal area, there being further a broad black oblique band from the costal margin to the second median branch, behind the band a round spot as in the female, at the hinder angle an elongate spot, anteriorly two transparent subapical spots; the distal margin edged with black. Hindwing also margined with black distally, with a median band composed of 6 black spots, the basal and hindmarginal areas grey dusted with black. Underside as in female, ground-colour of the forewing more yellow. West China: Omei-shan, Lufang; in July, very rare. — The second, but essentially different, known species of this genus, D. morgiana Westw., inhabits the mountains of North India and touches the Palaearctic territory only in the North-West (Kashmir). — Nothing is known of the habits.

== See also ==
- List of butterflies of Russia
