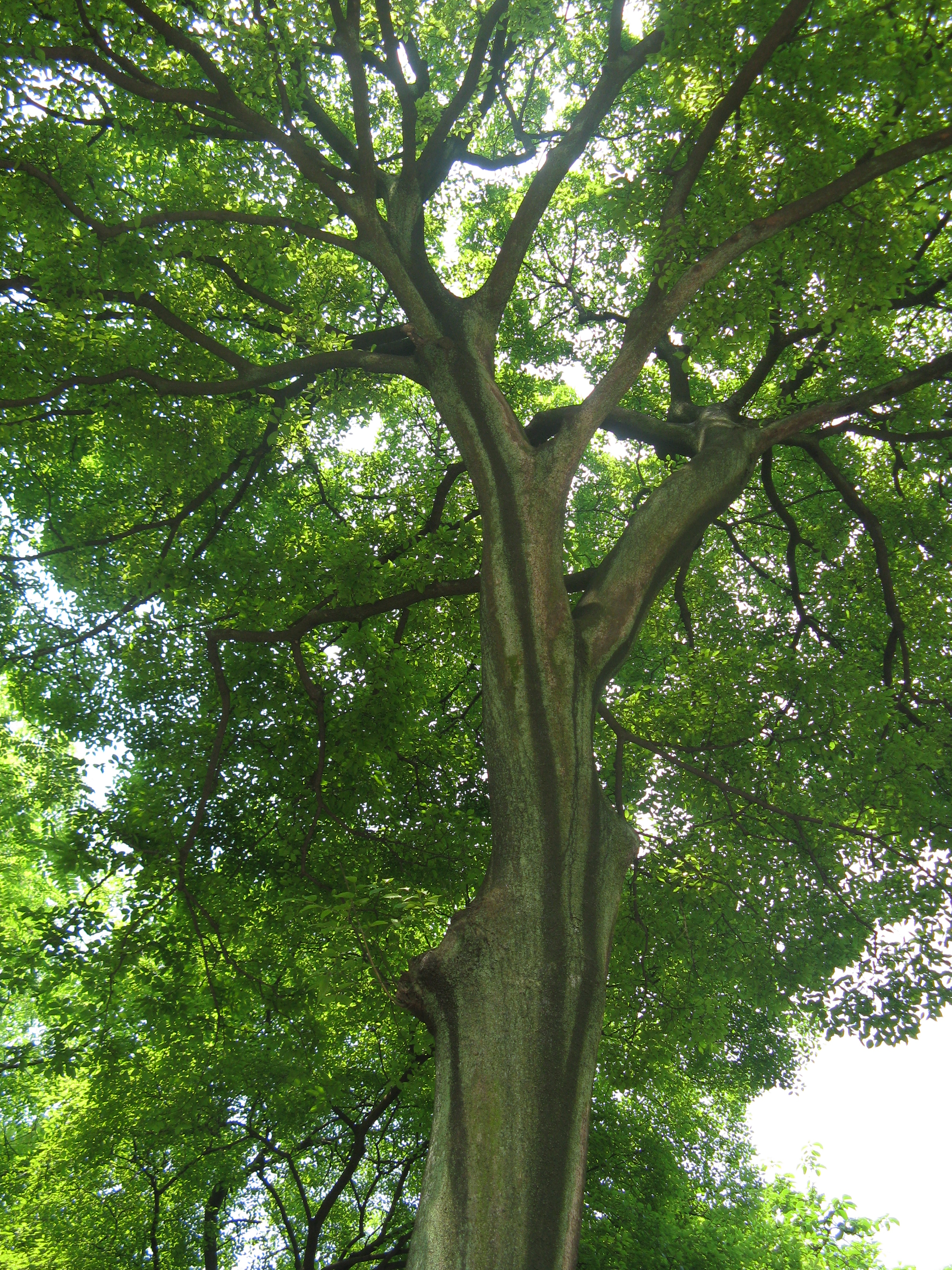
- Mature tree at Yuelu Academy

Scientific classification
- Kingdom: Plantae
- Clade: Tracheophytes
- Clade: Angiosperms
- Clade: Eudicots
- Clade: Rosids
- Order: Rosales
- Family: Cannabaceae
- Genus: Celtis
- Species: C. sinensis

Binomial name
- Celtis sinensis Pers.

Synonyms
- Celtis bodinieri H.Lév.; Celtis bungeana var. pubipedicella G.H.Wang; Celtis cercidifolia C.K.Schneid.; Celtis hunanensis Hand.-Mazz.; Celtis japonica Planch.; Celtis labilis C.K.Schneid.; Celtis nervosa Hemsl.; Celtis sinensis Willd.; Celtis sinensis var. japonica (Planch.) Nakai; Celtis tetrandra subsp. sinensis (Pers.) Y.C.Tang; Celtis willdenowiana Schult.

= Celtis sinensis =

Chinese hackberry

Species of tree

Celtis sinensis (English: Japanese hackberry, Chinese hackberry; Chinese: 朴树; Japanese: 榎) is a species of flowering plant in the hemp family, Cannabaceae, that is native to slopes in East Asia.

== Description ==
It is a tree that grows to 20 m tall, with deciduous leaves and gray bark. The fruit is a globose drupe, 5–7(–8) mm in diameter. Flowering occurs in March–April, and fruiting in September–October, in the Northern hemisphere.

== Distribution, habitat and uses ==
Native to slopes at altitudes of 100–1,500 m (330–4,920 ft) in Anhui, Fujian, Gansu, Guangdong, Guizhou, Henan, Jiangsu, Jiangxi, Shandong, Zhejiang, Sichuan, as well as Korea (팽나무), Japan and Taiwan. Leaves and bark are used in Korean medicine to treat menstruation and lung abscess. It is a naturalized non-invasive species in North America. It is a declared noxious weed in many parts of eastern Australia, where its seeds are spread by birds, fruit bats and water in riparian zones, roadsides, urban bushland, open woodlands, rainforest margins, waste areas, disturbed sites, parks and gardens, in sub-tropical and warm temperate regions.

As an ornamental plant, it is used in classical East Asian garden design.

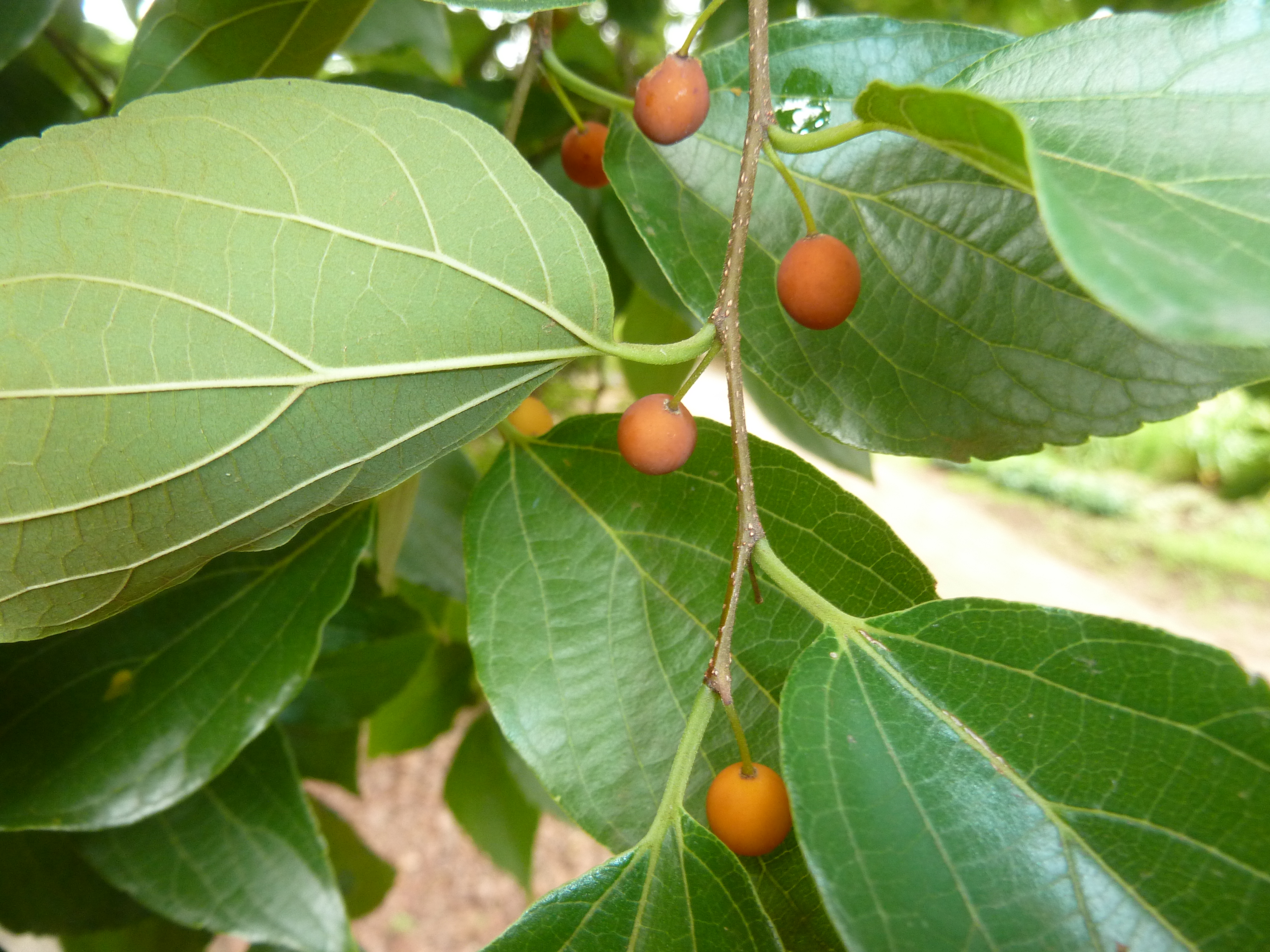
Foliage and ripe fruit

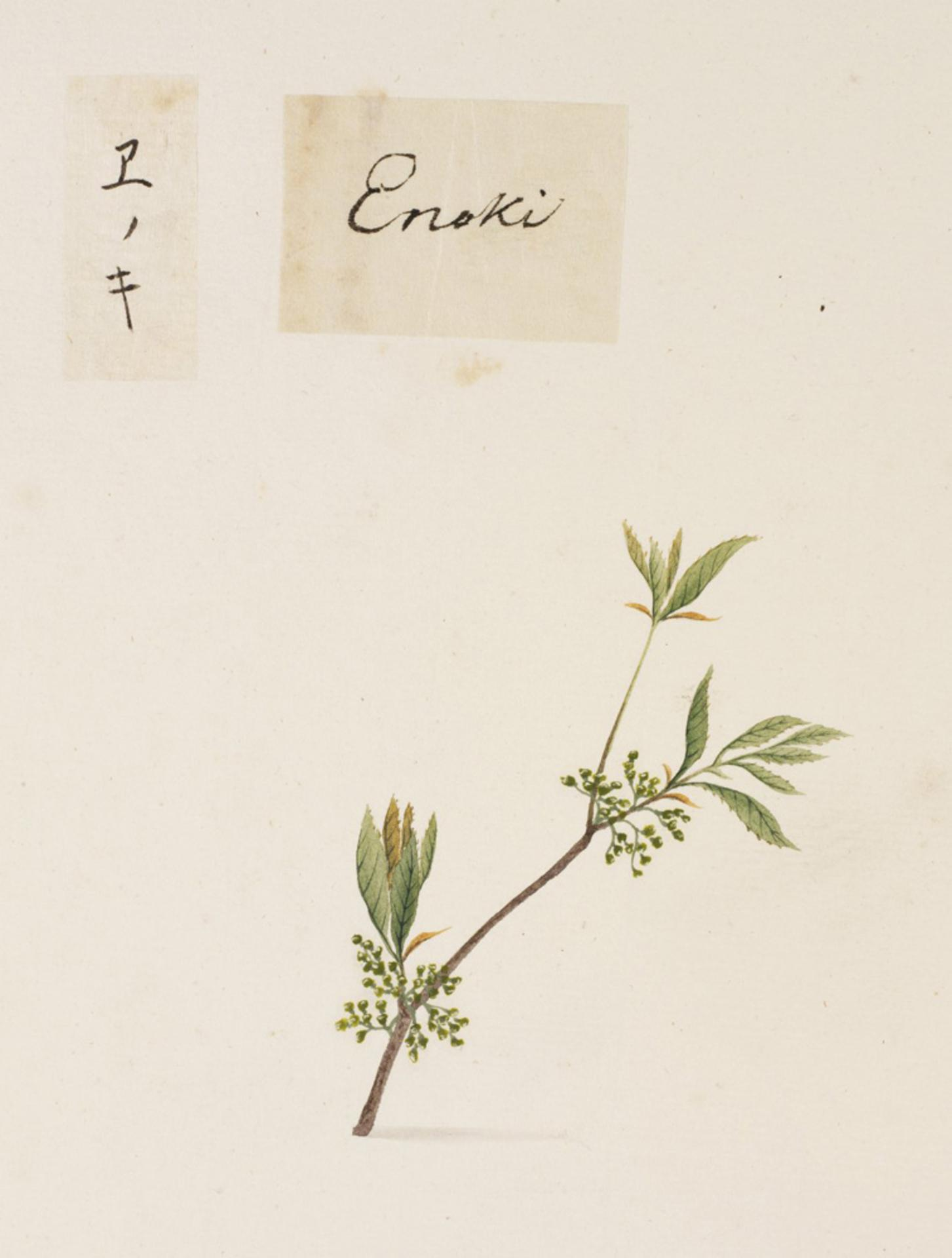
Kawahara Collection at Naturalis Biodiversity Center

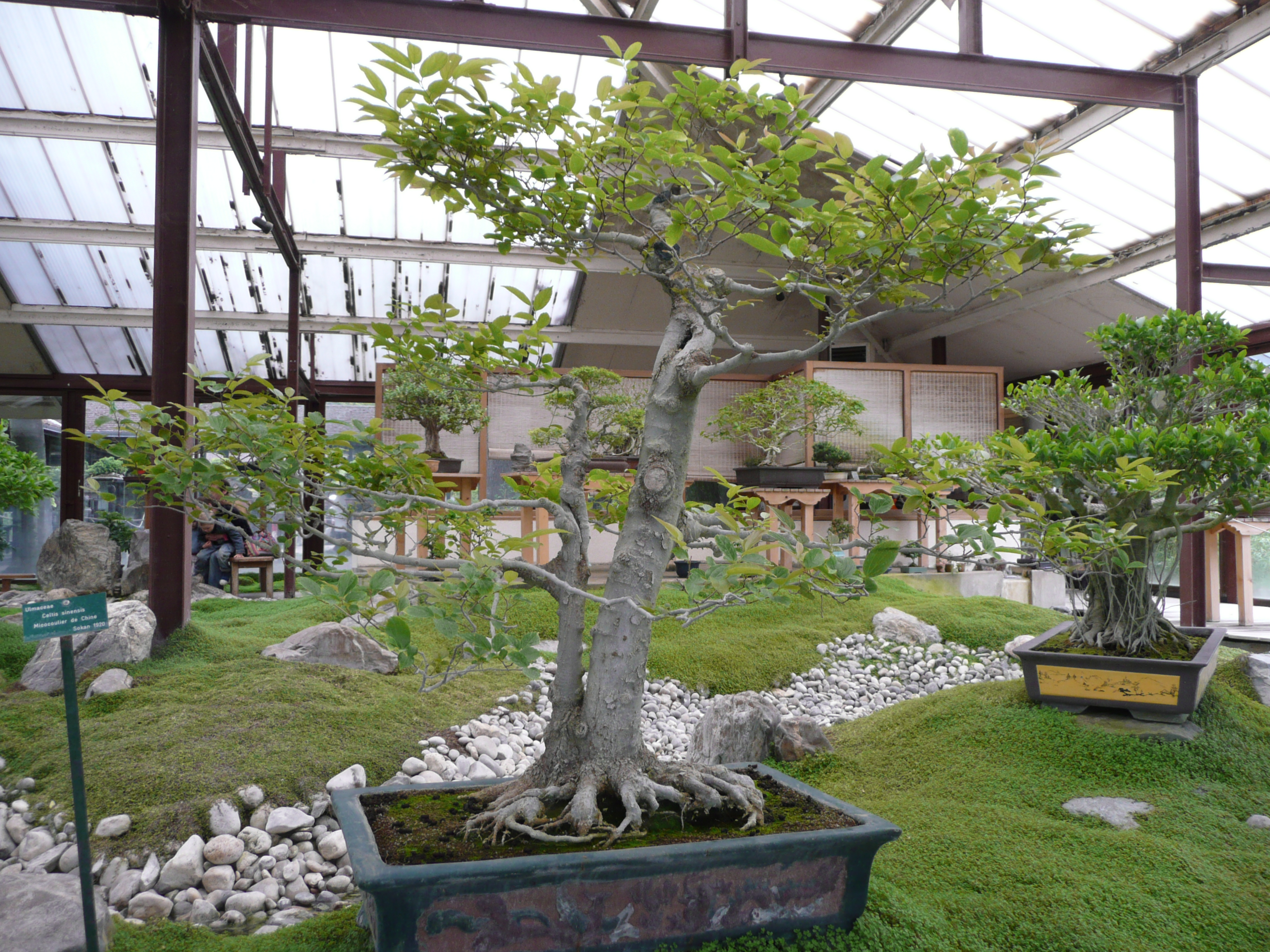
Celtis sinensis bonsai at the Parc floral de Paris

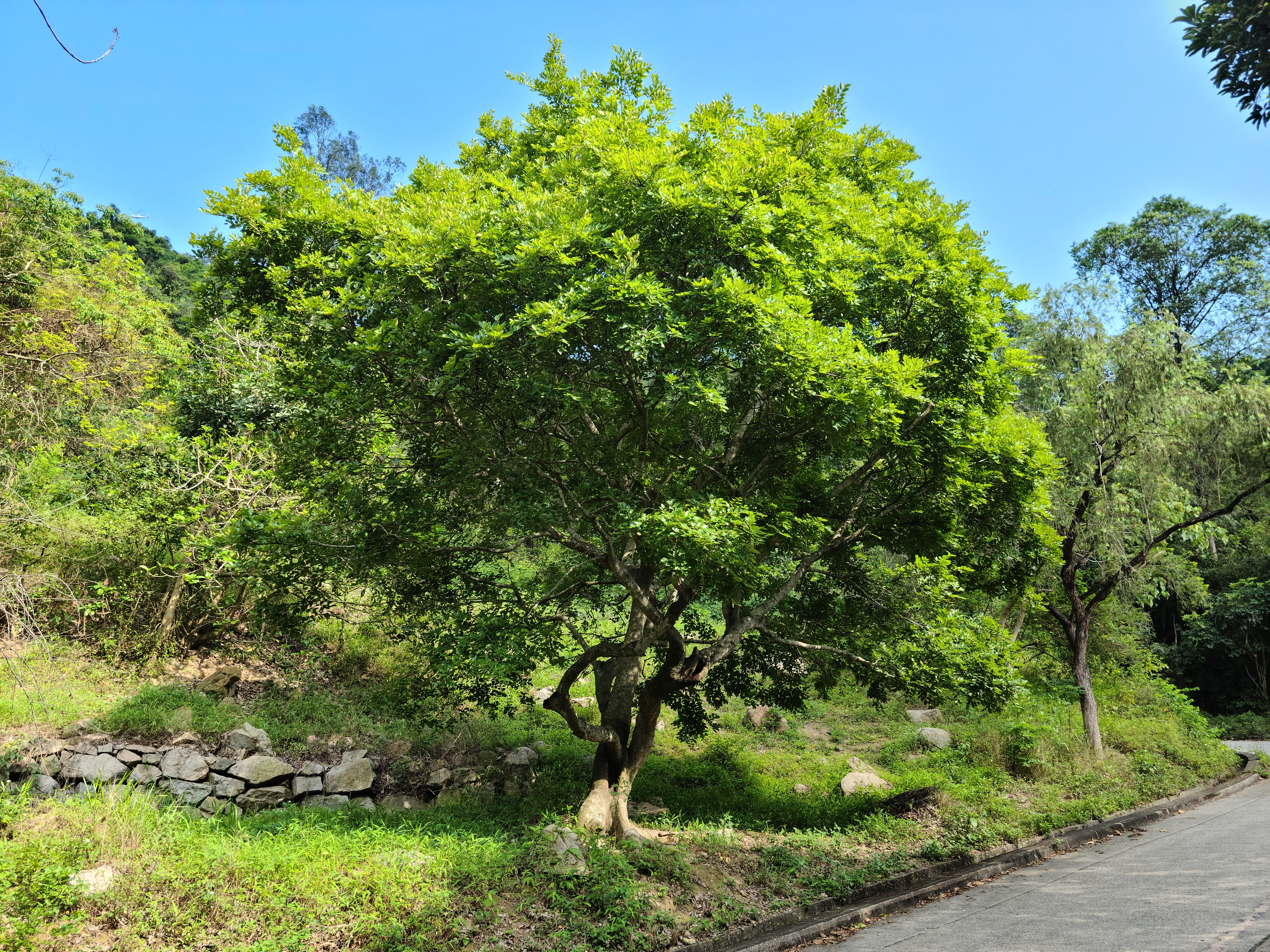
Whole Tree near Lower Shing Mun Reservoir

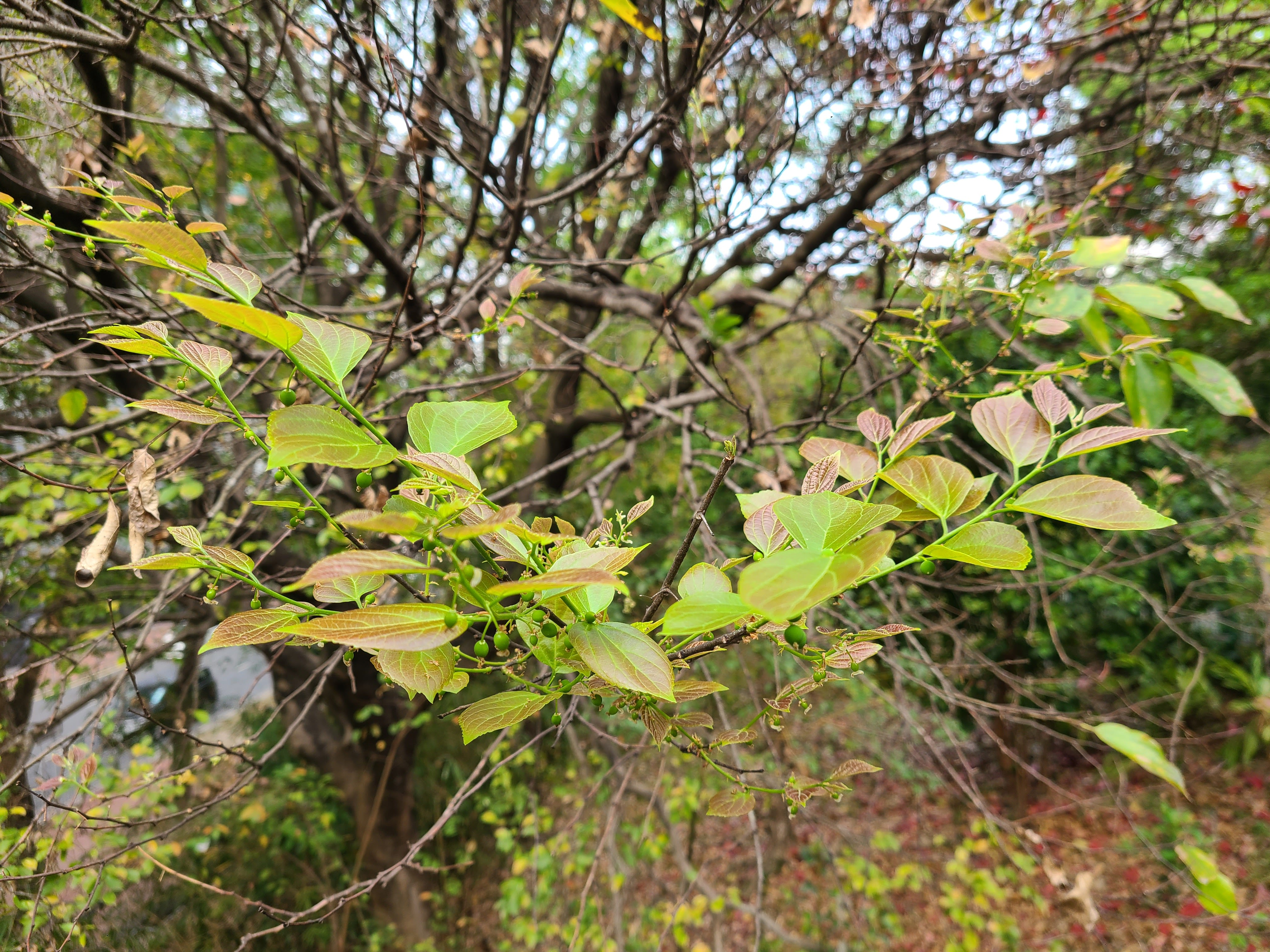
Spring Foliage at Shatin

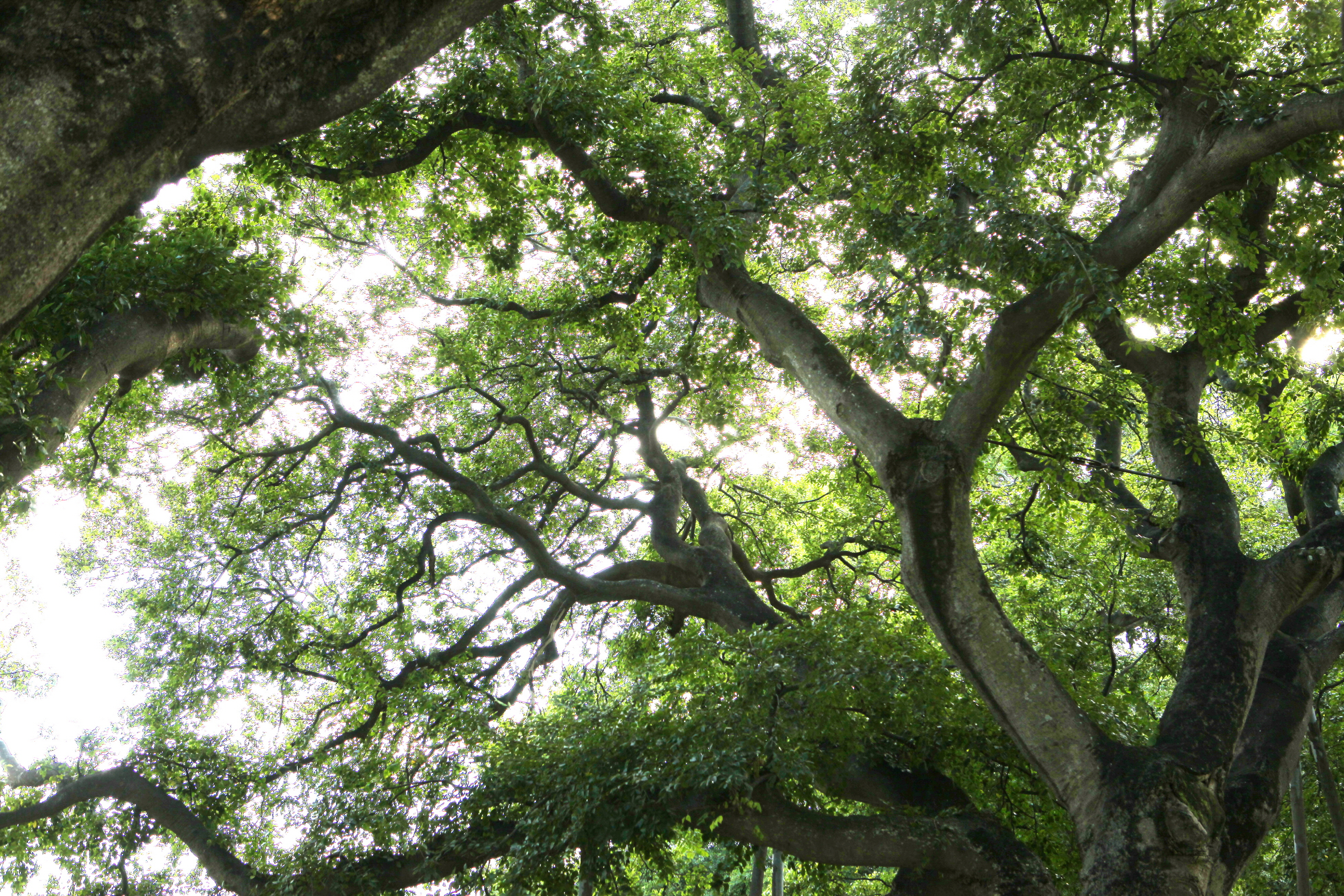
Boseong Jeonil-ri Hackberry Forest (Natural monument no. 480)

== See also ==
- Great purple emperor
