= Timelaea =

- Timelaea albescens

Scientific classification
- Domain: Eukaryota
- Kingdom: Animalia
- Phylum: Arthropoda
- Class: Insecta
- Order: Lepidoptera
- Family: Nymphalidae
- Subfamily: Apaturinae
- Genus: Timelaea; H. Lucas, 1883

Genus of brush-footed butterflies

Timelaea is a genus of butterflies in the family Nymphalidae. The genus was erected by Hippolyte Lucas in 1883.

== Species ==
- Timelaea maculata (Bremer & Grey, [1852])
- Timelaea albescens (Oberthür, 1886)
- Timelaea aformis Chou, 1994
- Timelaea radiata Chou & Wang, 1994
- Timelaea nana Leech, 1893
