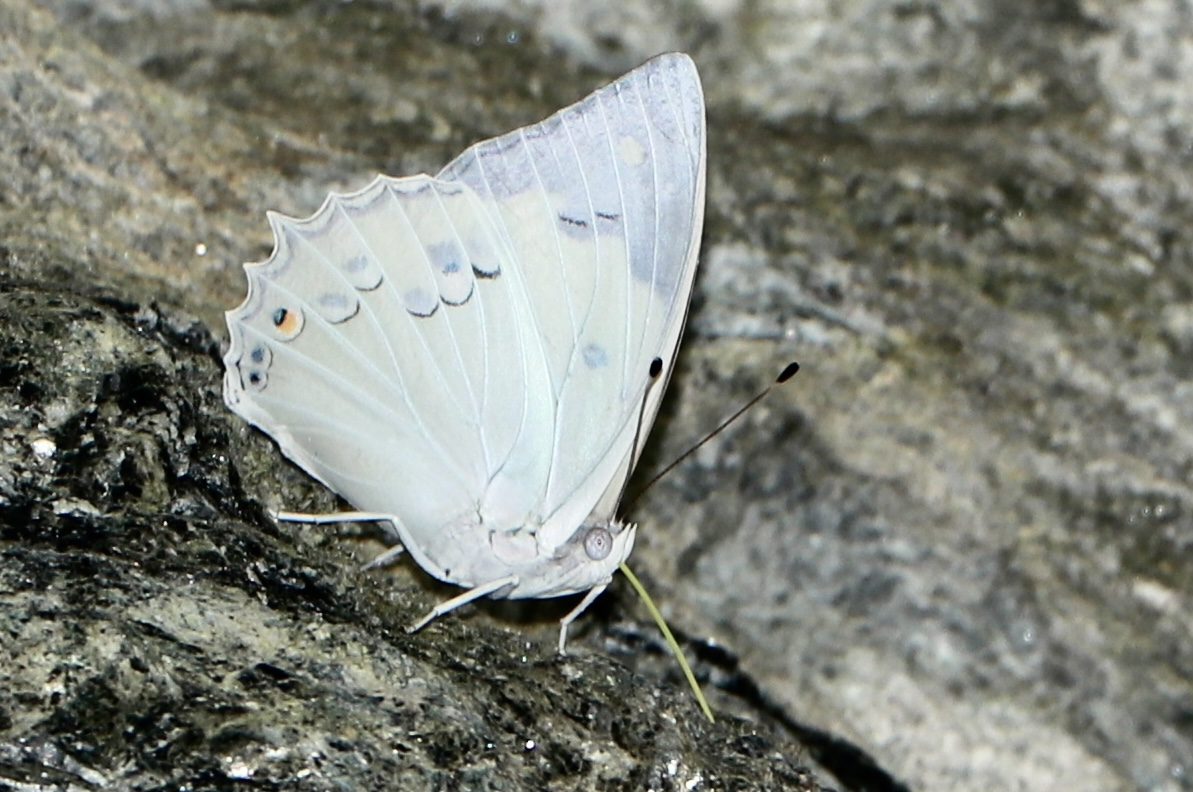

Scientific classification
- Kingdom: Animalia
- Phylum: Arthropoda
- Class: Insecta
- Order: Lepidoptera
- Family: Nymphalidae
- Genus: Helcyra
- Species: H. hemina

Binomial name
- Helcyra hemina Hewitson, 1864

= Helcyra hemina =

White emperor

Species of butterfly

Helcyra hemina, the white emperor, is a species of brush-footed butterfly found in parts of India, in Myanmar, Thailand, Laos, Vietnam and Java.

In India this species is protected under Schedule I of the Wildlife (Protection) Act, 2022.

== Subspecies ==
- Helcyra hemina hemina (Sikkim, Assam, Burma)
- Helcyra hemina masinia Fruhstorfer, 1903 (western Java)
