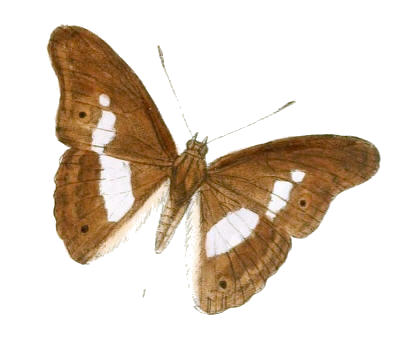
- Eulaceura osteria

Scientific classification
- Domain: Eukaryota
- Kingdom: Animalia
- Phylum: Arthropoda
- Class: Insecta
- Order: Lepidoptera
- Family: Nymphalidae
- Subfamily: Apaturinae
- Genus: Eulaceura; Butler, 1872

= Eulaceura =

Genus of brush-footed butterflies

Eulaceura is a genus of butterflies in the family Nymphalidae and subfamily Apaturinae.

The genus contains two species:

- Eulaceura manipuriensis Tytler, 1915 – Tytler's emperor – Manipur, Indochina
- Eulaceura osteria (Westwood, 1850)
  - E. o. osteria Java, Borneo, Malaya
  - E. o. kumana Fruhstorfer, 1913 Peninsular Malaya, Singapore
  - E. o. nicomedeia Fruhstorfer Sumatra
  - E. o. jembala Fruhstorfer Borneo
  - E. o. bipupillata Lathy Nias
  - E. o. sitarama Fruhstorfer Hainan
  - E. o. tanahmasa Hanafusa, 1996 Indonesia, Batu Islands, Tanahmasa Island
  - E. o. nakamotoi Miyata & Hanafusa, 1989 Indonesia, Belitung Island
  - E. o. baraena Corbet, 1942 Mentawi Island
