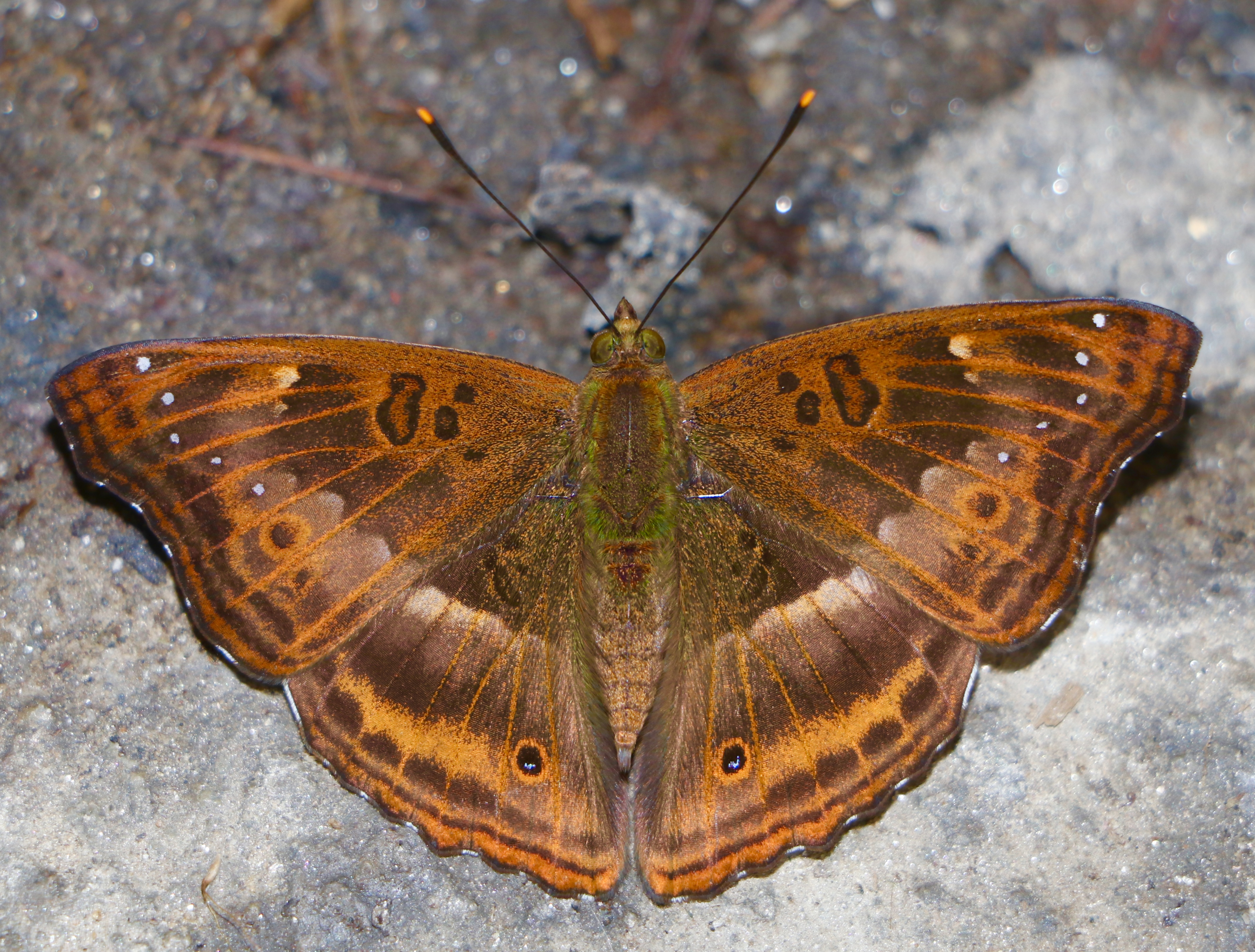
- Rohana parvata in Horsfield and Moore (figure 6 as Apatura parvata) Moore, 1857

Scientific classification
- Domain: Eukaryota
- Kingdom: Animalia
- Phylum: Arthropoda
- Class: Insecta
- Order: Lepidoptera
- Family: Nymphalidae
- Genus: Rohana
- Species: R. parvata

Binomial name
- Rohana parvata (Moore, 1857)

= Rohana parvata =

Species of butterfly

Rohana parvata, the brown prince, is an Indomalayan butterfly of the family Nymphalidae. The species was first described by Frederic Moore in 1857. It is found from Sikkim to Assam, Bhutan and Nepal. The subspecies R. p. burmana (Tytler, 1940) is found in Myanmar.
