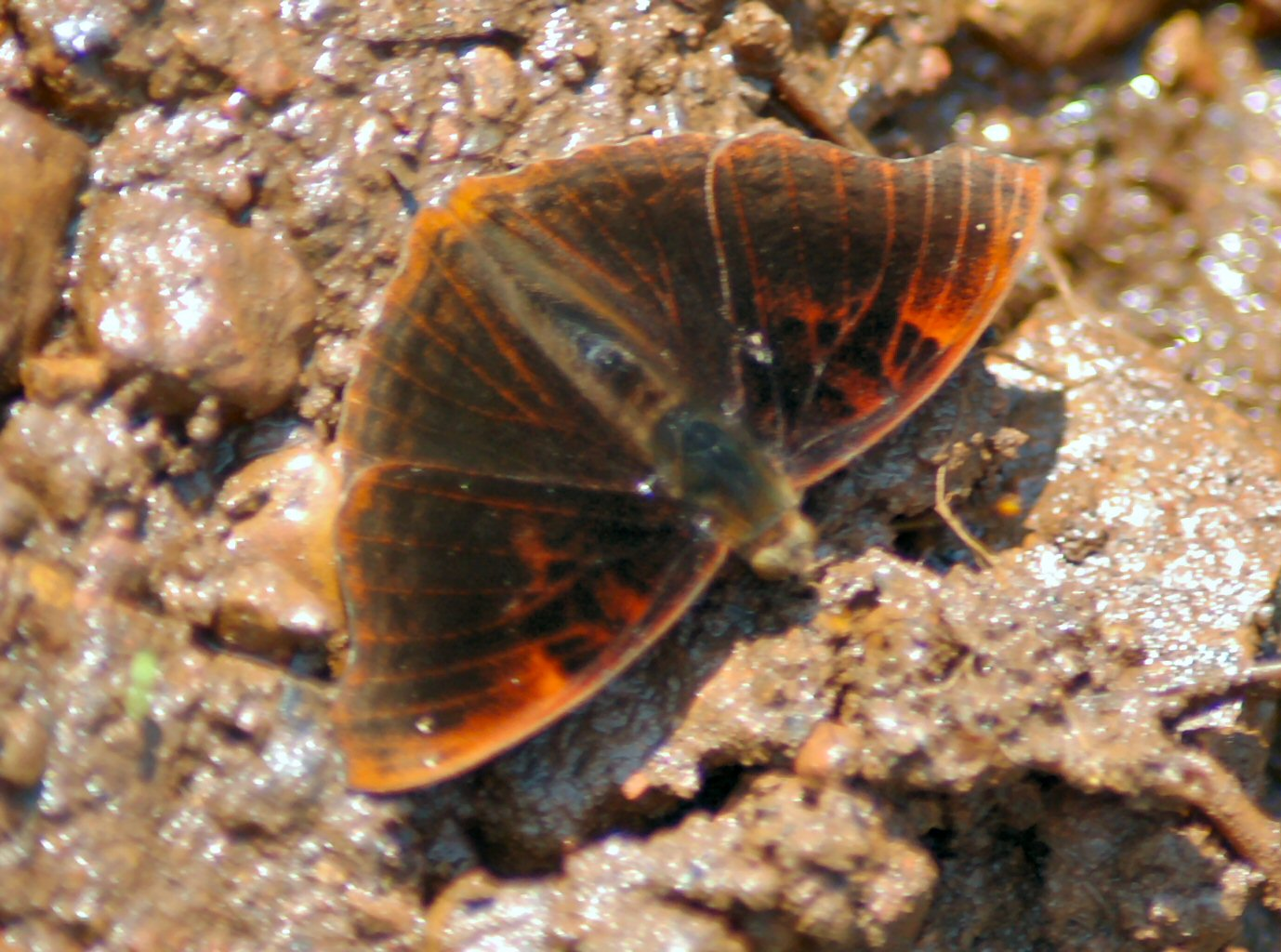
- Rohana parisatis

Scientific classification
- Kingdom: Animalia
- Phylum: Arthropoda
- Class: Insecta
- Order: Lepidoptera
- Family: Nymphalidae
- Subfamily: Apaturinae
- Genus: Rohana; Moore, 1880

= Rohana =

Genus of brush-footed butterflies

Rohana is a genus of butterflies in the family Nymphalidae.

== Species ==
- Rohana parisatis (Westwood, 1850) – black prince
- Rohana tonkiniana Fruhstorfer, 1906
- Rohana nakula (Moore, [1858])
- Rohana ruficincta Lathy, 1913
- Rohana rhea (C. & R. Felder, 1863)
- Rohana macar Wallace, 1869 – Wallace's black prince
- Rohana parvata (Moore, 1857) – brown prince
