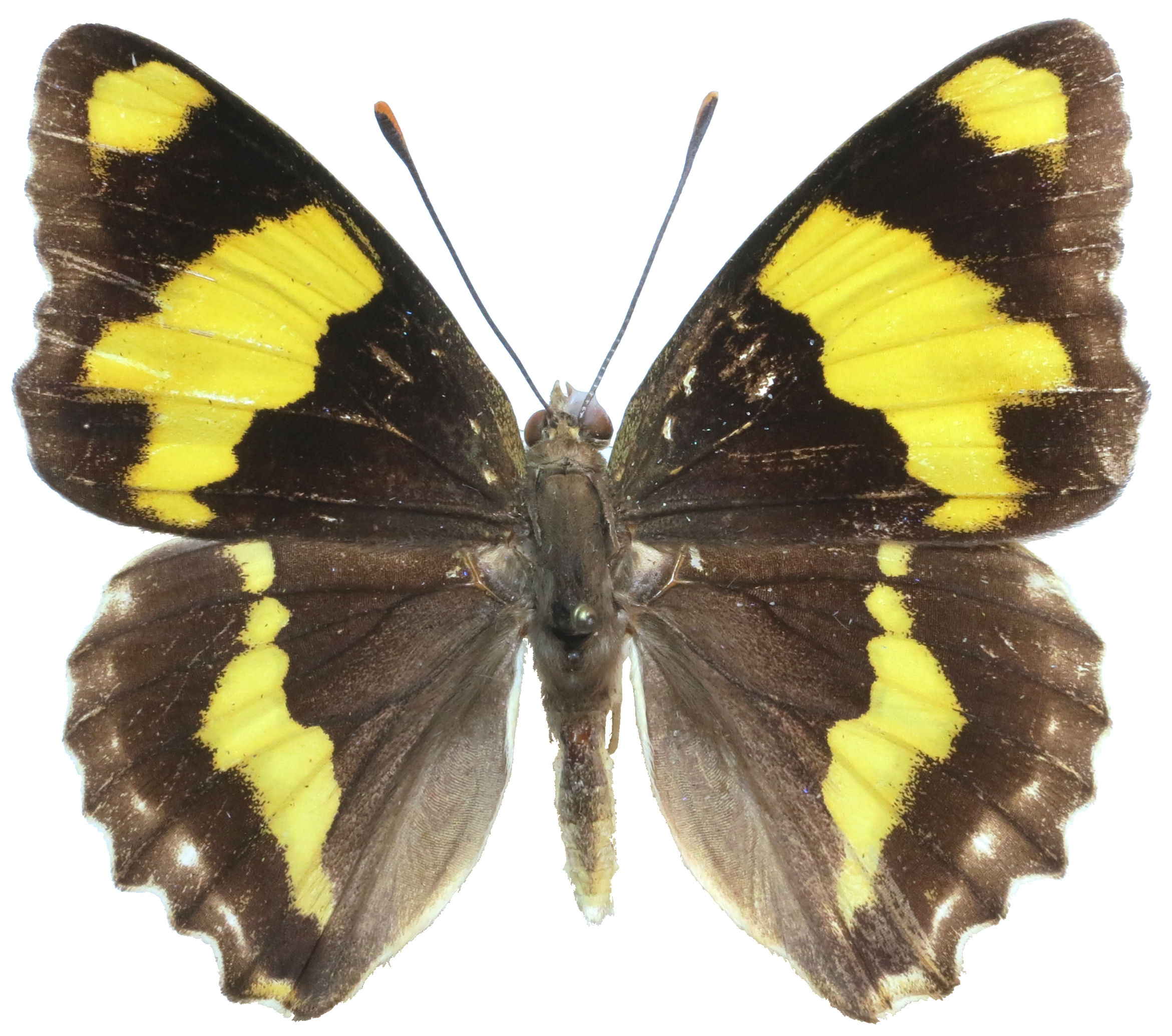
- Euapatura mirza male - Hakkâri Province, Turkey

Scientific classification
- Kingdom: Animalia
- Phylum: Arthropoda
- Class: Insecta
- Order: Lepidoptera
- Family: Nymphalidae
- Subfamily: Apaturinae
- Genus: Euapatura; Ebert, 1971
- Species: E. mirza

Binomial name
- Euapatura mirza Ebert, 1971

= Euapatura =

Monotypic brush-footed butterfly genus

Euapatura is a genus of butterflies in the family Nymphalidae. It is monotypic, containing only the species Euapatura mirza found in northern Iraq.
