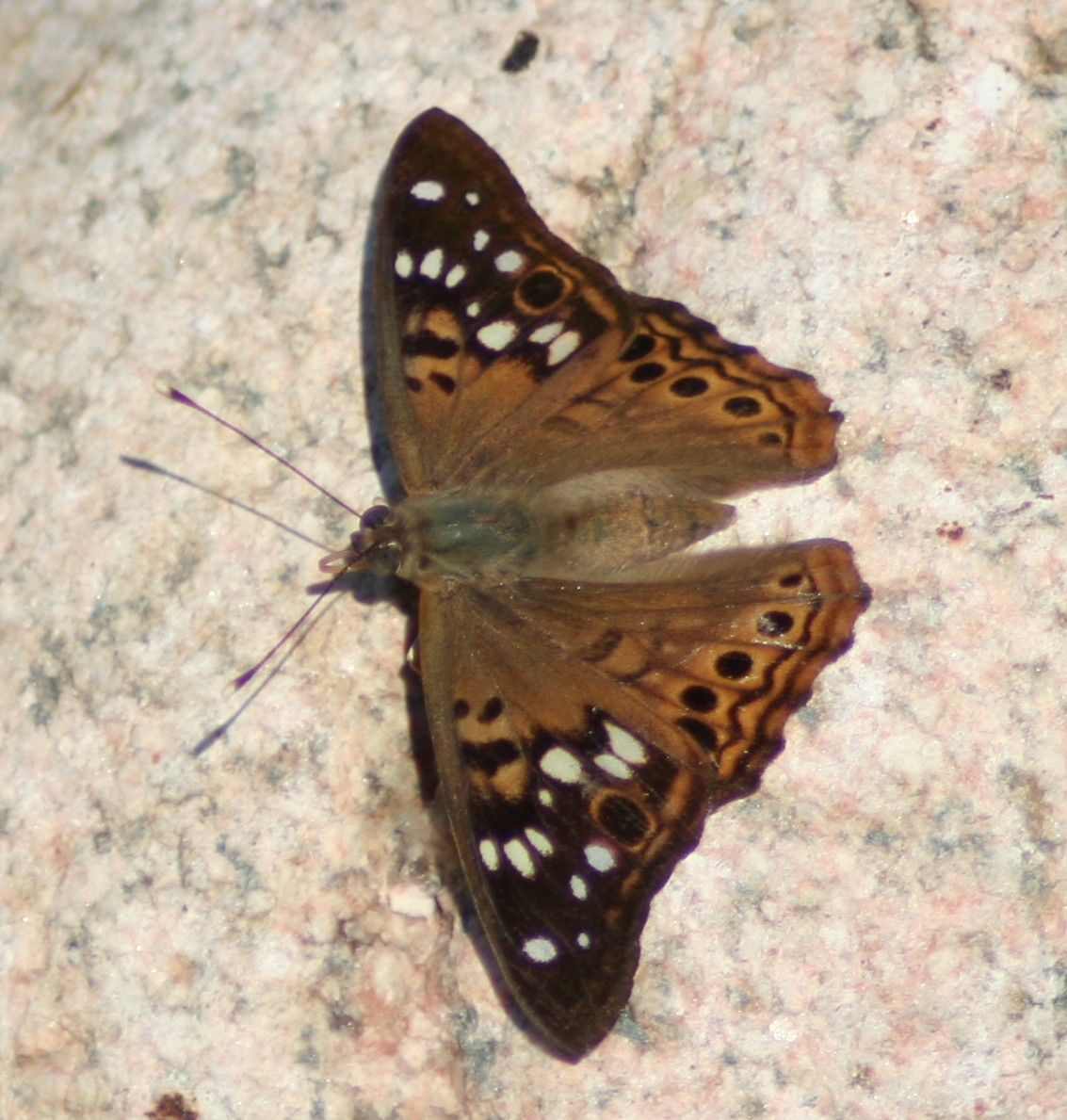
- Asterocampa celtis

Scientific classification
- Domain: Eukaryota
- Kingdom: Animalia
- Phylum: Arthropoda
- Class: Insecta
- Order: Lepidoptera
- Family: Nymphalidae
- Subfamily: Apaturinae; Boisduval, 1840

= Apaturinae =

Subfamily of the butterfly family Nymphalidae

The Apaturinae are a subfamily of butterflies that includes many species commonly called emperors.

== Description ==
Strikingly-coloured, with cryptic underwing. A distinguishing character of the subfamily is the green proboscis.

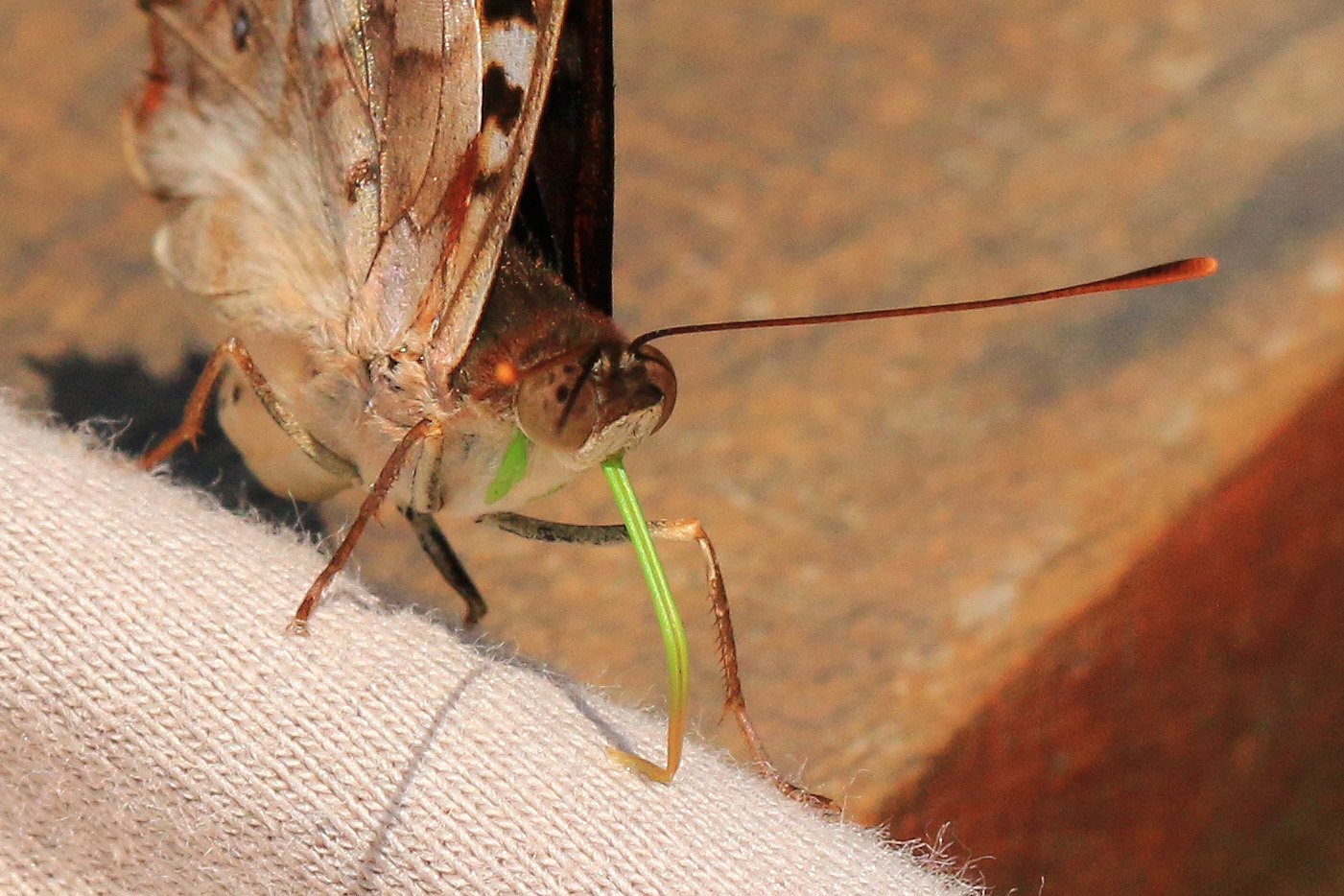
Doxocopa agathina with green proboscis

== Genera ==
Apaturinae consists of 20 genera and shows separate distributions and uncommon host–plant associations. Most genera of this subfamily are found throughout South-East Asia and Africa, whereas the genera Doxocopa and Asterocampa are spread mainly in South America and North America.

- Apatura
- Apaturina
- Apaturopsis
- Asterocampa
- Chitoria
- Dilipa
- Doxocopa
- Euapatura
- Eulaceura
- Euripus
- Helcyra
- Herona
- Hestina
- Hestinalis
- Mimathyma
- Rohana
- Sasakia
- Sephisa
- Thaleropis
- Timelaea
