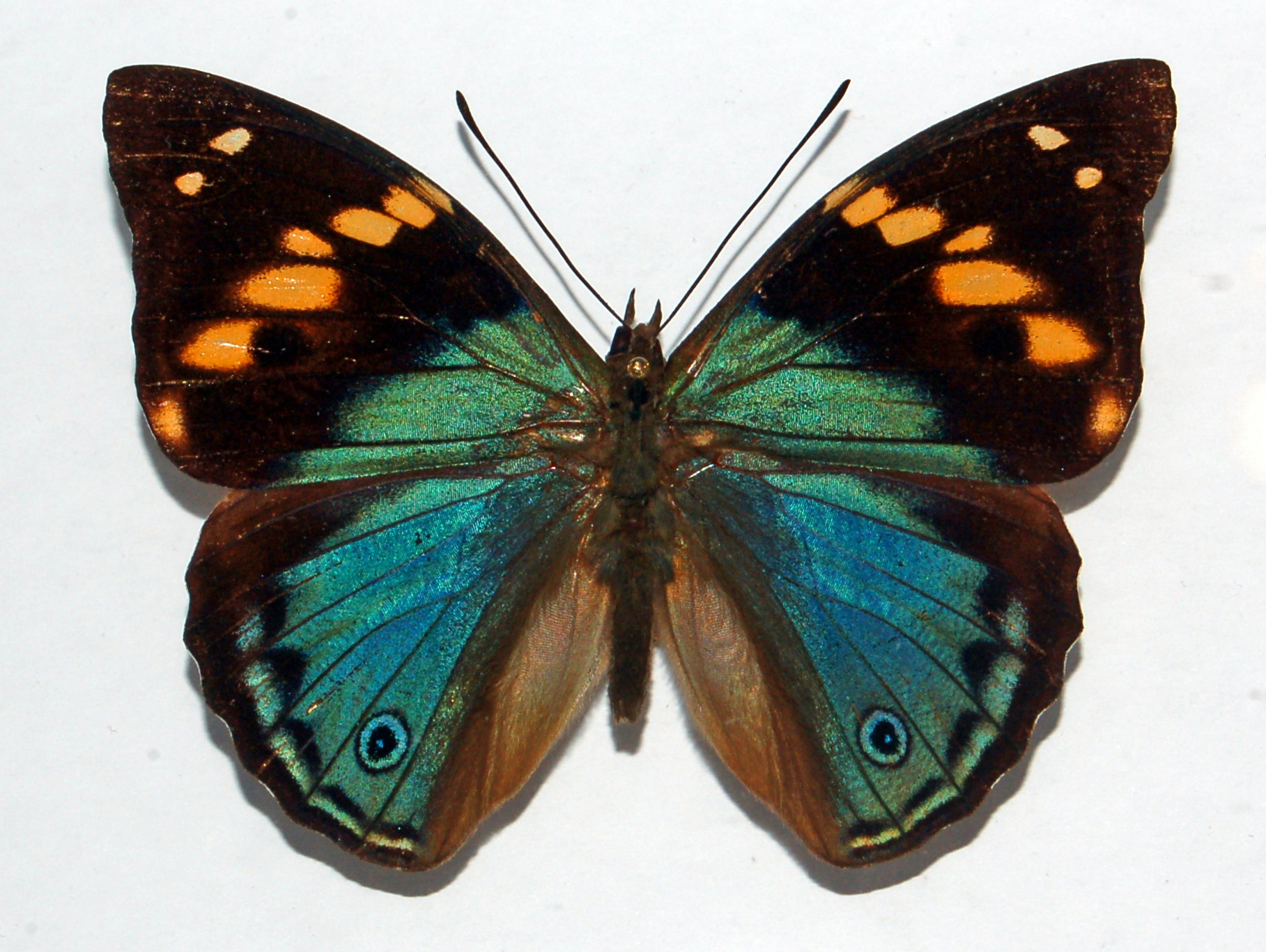
- Male Apaturina erminea papuana

Scientific classification
- Kingdom: Animalia
- Phylum: Arthropoda
- Clade: Pancrustacea
- Class: Insecta
- Order: Lepidoptera
- Family: Nymphalidae
- Subfamily: Apaturinae
- Genus: Apaturina; Herrich-Schäffer, 1864
- Species: A. erminea

Binomial name
- Apaturina erminea (Cramer, 1779)

Synonyms
- Papilio erminea Cramer, 1779; Apaturina aruensis Joicey & Talbot, 1924; Apaturina splendidissima Bryk, 1939; Apaturina principalis Bryk, 1939; Apaturina androtropa Bryk, 1939; Apaturina erminea var. microps Röber, 1894

= Apaturina =

Turquoise emperor

Monotypic genus of brush-footed butterflies

Apaturina is a monotypic genus of butterflies in the family Nymphalidae. Its sole species is Apaturina erminea, the turquoise emperor.

== Description ==
Apaturina erminea has a wingspan of about 70 millimetres (2.8 in), and males measure marginally larger than females. The uppersides of the forewings are black with an iridescent blue-green base, two white small spots at the apex and a diagonal series of pale yellow patches across each wing. The uppersides of the hindwings are completely iridescent blue green in males, or chestnut brown in females, with an eyespot on each wing. The undersides are quite similar but the basic color is grayish brown, without iridescence.

== Food and behavior ==
The adults feed on various liquids, from rotting fruits and sap. The caterpillars feed on Celtis latifolia (Ulmaceae). Males are very fast flyers, but settle for long periods in trees, where they perch head down and wings closed, more than 7 m from the ground.

== Distribution ==
This species can be found in Indonesia (Aru Islands, Irian Jaya, Maluku), Papua New Guinea, Solomon Islands up to northern Australia. In Australia it is limited to lowland tropical rainforest in the Iron Range.

== Subspecies ==
- Apaturina erminea erminea (Cramer, 1779) (Ambon, Serang)
- Apaturina erminea papuana (Ribbe, 1886) (Papua New Guinea)
- Apaturina erminea mirona Fruhstorfer, 1904 (Buru)
- Apaturina erminea erinna Fruhstorfer, 1904 (Obi)
- Apaturina erminea aluna Fruhstorfer, 1904 (Alu)
- Apaturina erminea ribbei Röber, 1894 (Bachan, Halmahera)
- Apaturina erminea octavia Fruhstorfer, 1904 (Waigeu)
- Apaturina erminea antonia Fruhstorfer, 1904 (Papua New Guinea)
- Apaturina erminea xanthocera Rothschild, 1904 (Solomon Islands)
- Apaturina erminea neopommerania Hagen, 1879 (Bismarck Archipelago)

== Gallery ==
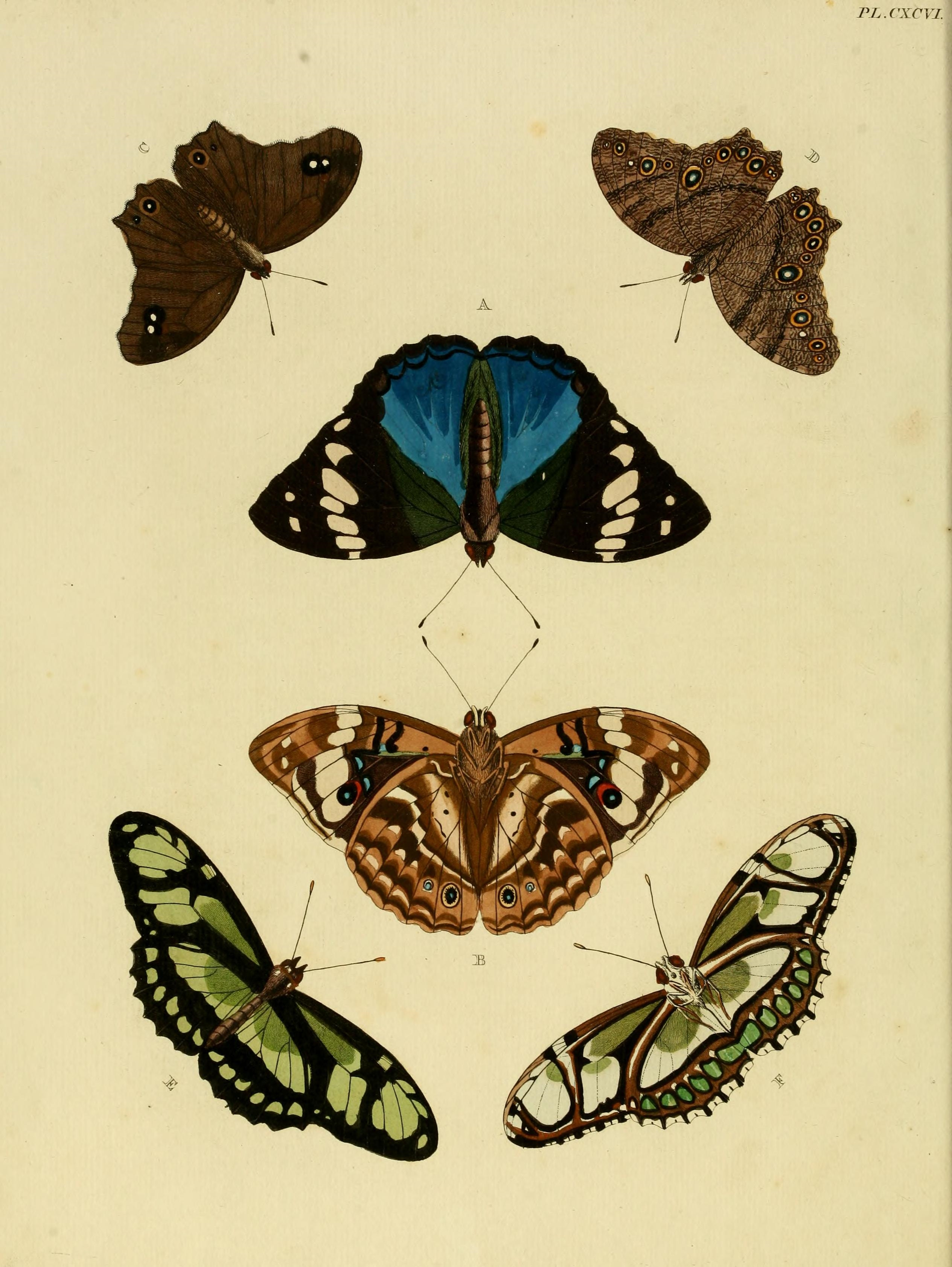
Male from Papillons exotiques des trois parties du monde by Pieter Cramer and Caspar Stoll

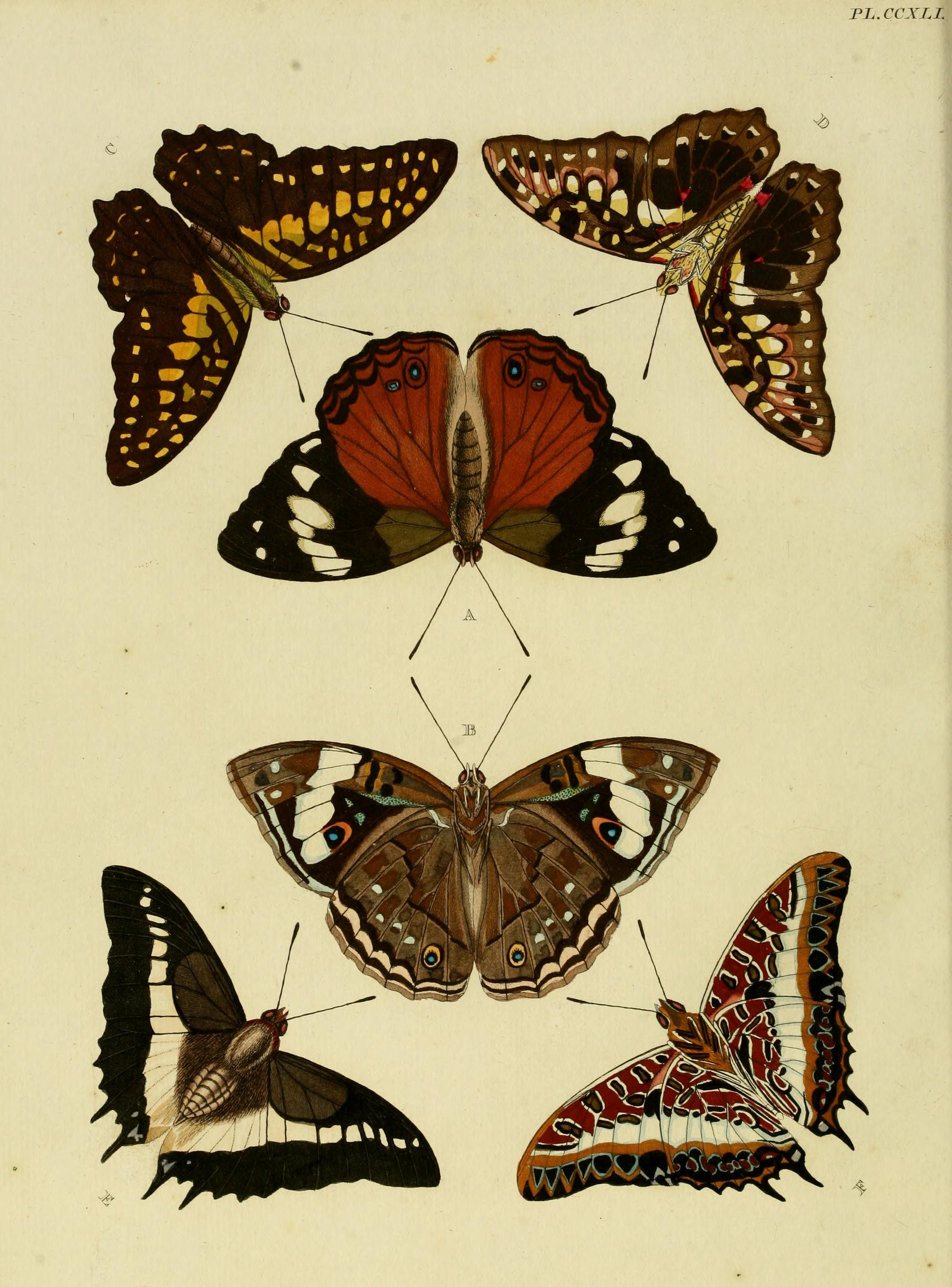
Female from Papillons exotiques des trois parties du monde
