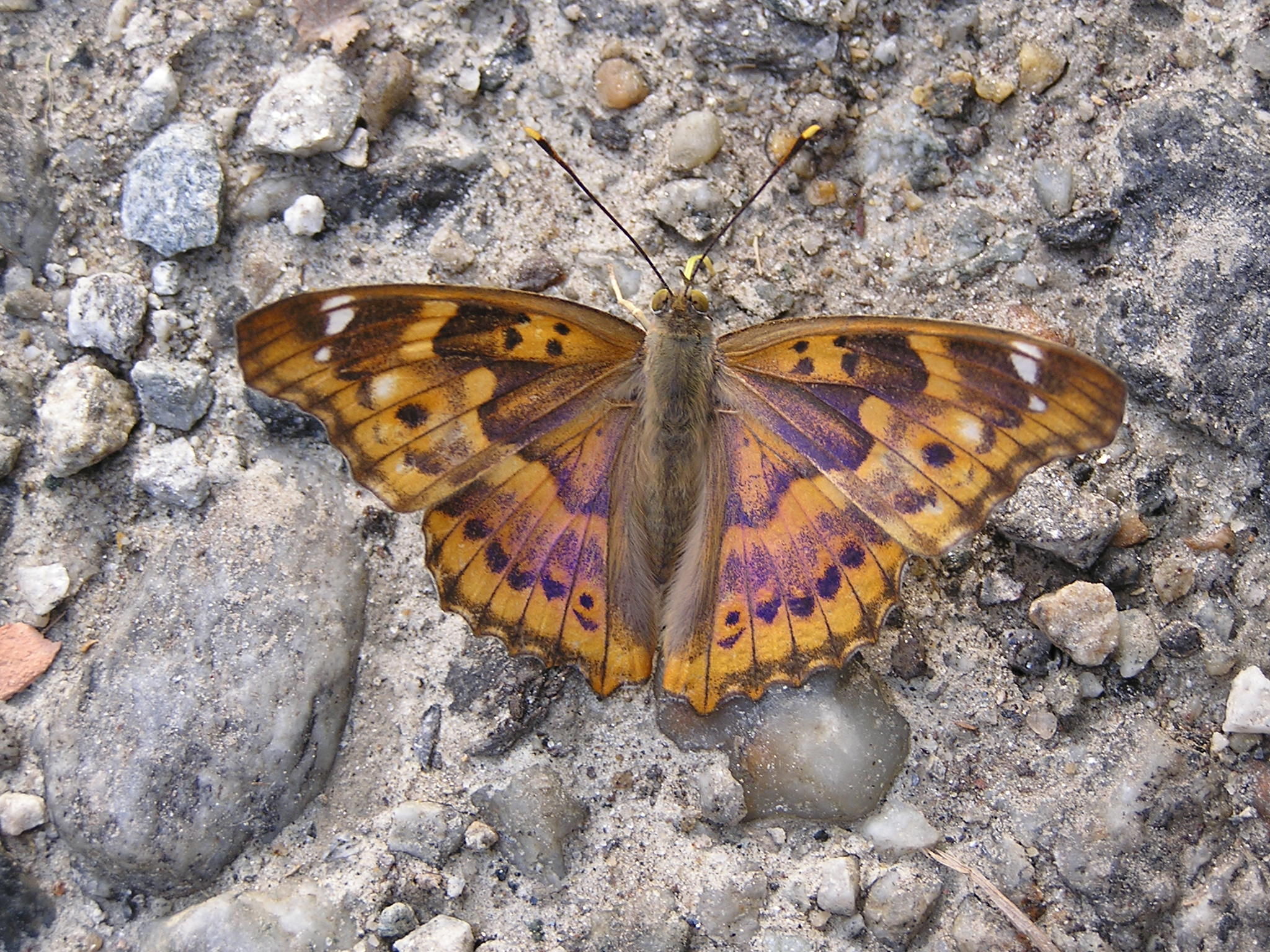
- Lesser purple emperor

Scientific classification
- Kingdom: Animalia
- Phylum: Arthropoda
- Clade: Pancrustacea
- Class: Insecta
- Order: Lepidoptera
- Family: Nymphalidae
- Subfamily: Apaturinae
- Genus: Apatura; Fabricius, 1807

Species
- See text

Synonyms
- Aeola Billberg, 1820; Apaturia Sodoffsky, 1837; Athymodes Moore, 1896; Bremeria Moore, 1896; Chitoria Moore, 1896; Dravira Moore, 1896; Limina Moore, 1896; Mars Girard, 1866; Mimathyma Moore, 1896; Narsenga Moore, 1896; Potamis Hübner, [1806]; Rohana Moore, 1880; Sincana Moore, 1896

= Apatura =

Genus of brush-footed butterflies

Apatura is a genus of butterflies commonly known as the emperors.

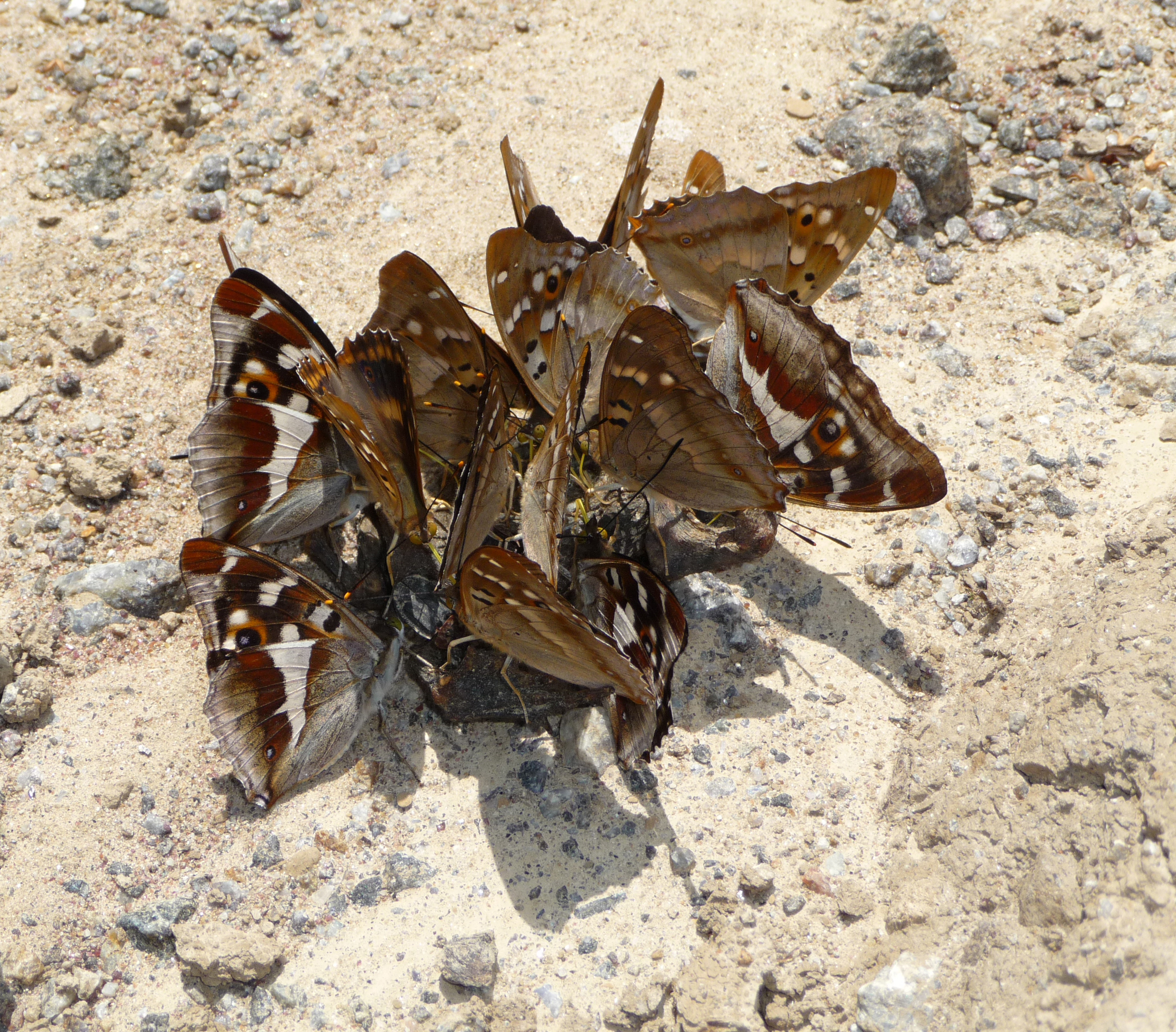
Purple emperors (Apatura iris) and lesser purple emperors (Apatura ilia) sucking moisture from the body of a dead common frog (Rana temporaria), Ukraine

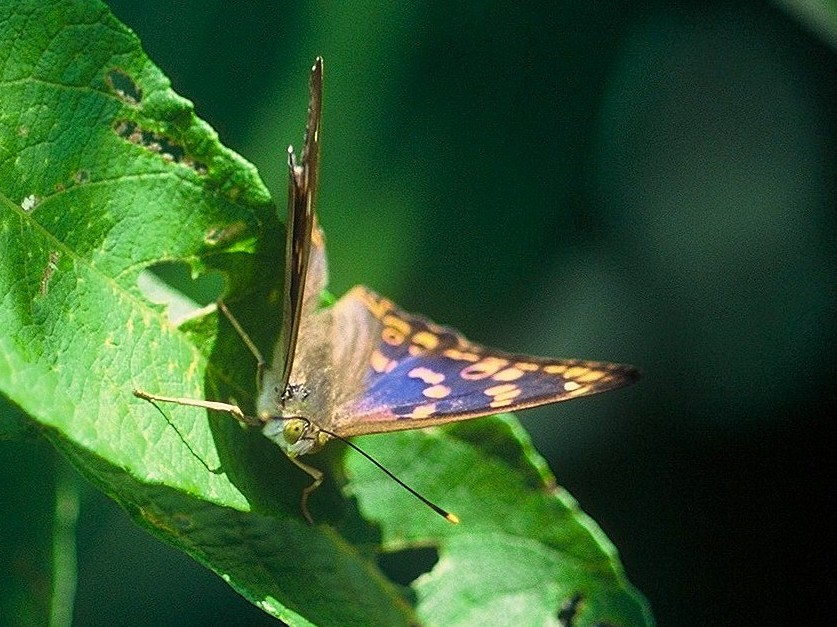
Freyer's purple emperor (Apatura metis substituta). Japan

== Species ==
Listed alphabetically:

- Apatura ilia ([Denis and Schiffermüller], 1775) – lesser purple emperor
- Apatura iris (Linnaeus, 1758) – purple emperor
- Apatura laverna Leech, 1893
- Apatura metis Freyer, 1829 – Freyer's purple emperor

Moved to genus Chitoria:

- Apatura fasciola (Leech, 1890) now in Chitoria fasciola
- Apatura sordida (Moore, 1865) – sordid emperor now in Chitoria sordida
- Apatura ulupi (Doherty, 1889) – tawny emperor now in Chitoria ulupi
- Apatura vietnamica Nguyen, 1979 now in Chitoria vietnamica

Moved to genus Mimathyma:

- Apatura ambica (Kollar, 1844) – Indian purple emperor now in Mimathyma ambica
- Apatura chevana Moore 1865 – sergeant emperor now in Mimathyma chevana
- Apatura nycteis Ménétriès, 1859 now in Mimathyma nycteis
- Apatura schrenckii Ménétriès, 1858 – Schrenck's emperor now in Mimathyma schrenckii
