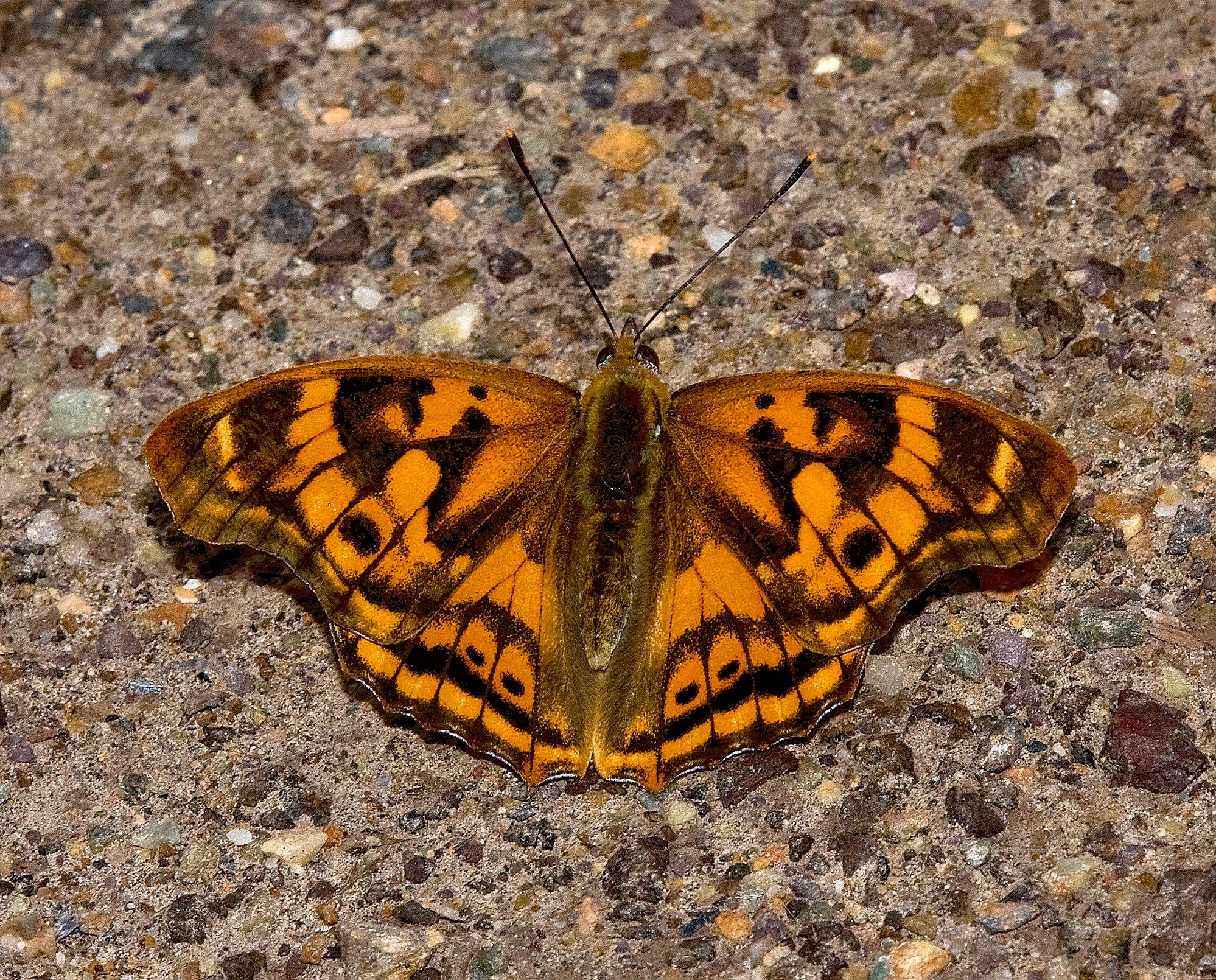
- Apatura laverna

Scientific classification
- Domain: Eukaryota
- Kingdom: Animalia
- Phylum: Arthropoda
- Class: Insecta
- Order: Lepidoptera
- Family: Nymphalidae
- Genus: Apatura
- Species: A. laverna

Binomial name
- Apatura laverna (Leech, 1893)

= Apatura laverna =

Species of butterfly

Apatura laverna is a butterfly found in the Palearctic that belongs to the emperors group within the brushfooted family. It is endemic to China.

== Subspecies ==
- A. l. laverna Sichuan, Shaanxi
- A. l. yunlingensis Yoshino, 1999 N.Yunnan

== Description from Seitz ==
A. laverna Leech (51a) recalls A. ilia here in the shape of the wings, but the distal margin of the fore-wing is more distinctly angulate below the apex and more deeply incurved below this angle. Ground-colour deep ochreous-brown, the markings blackish and similar to those of the subspecies of A. ilia mentioned above, but the rounded spots in the distal area of the hindwing are absent, there being here a narrow blackish band at the outer side of which stands a row of whitish spots. Female not known. — West China : Pu-tsu-fong, Wa-ssukow, Omei-shan, in June and July, at altitudes of from 1200 to 3000 m.
