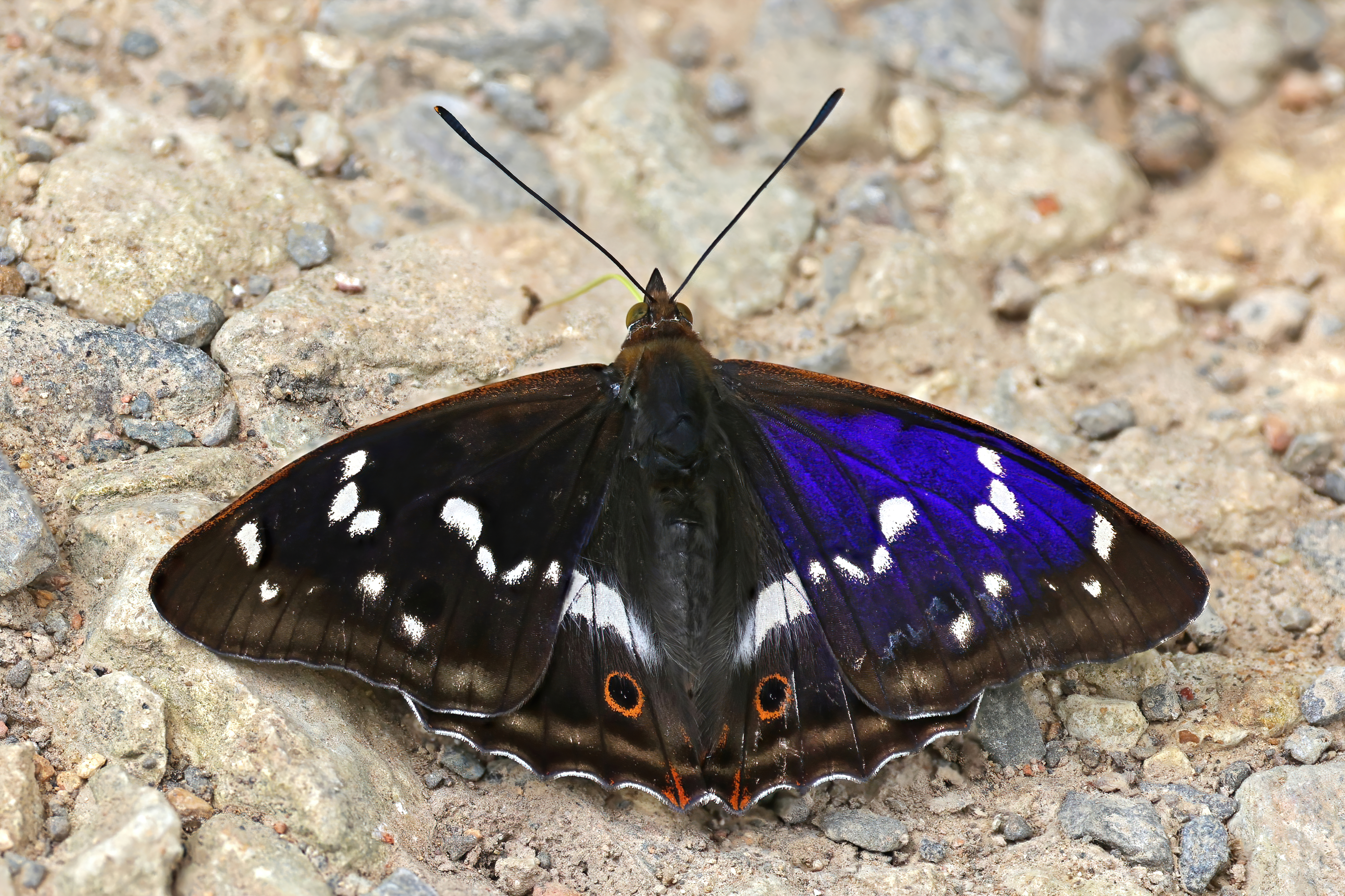
- Male
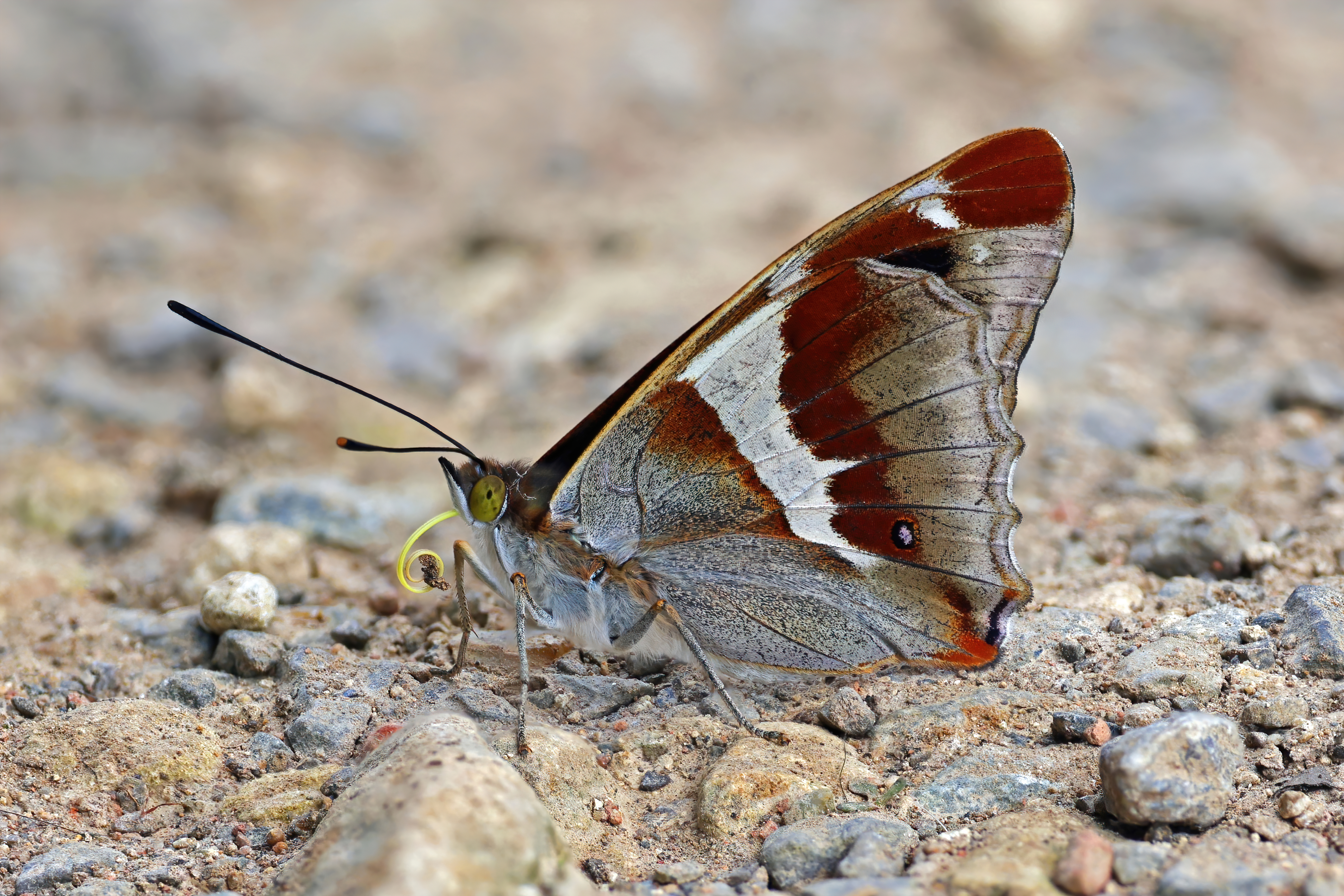
- Both images are of the same male Bernwood Forest, Oxfordshire

Scientific classification
- Kingdom: Animalia
- Phylum: Arthropoda
- Clade: Pancrustacea
- Class: Insecta
- Order: Lepidoptera
- Family: Nymphalidae
- Genus: Apatura
- Species: A. iris

Binomial name
- Apatura iris (Linnaeus, 1758)

Synonyms
- Papilio iris Linnaeus, 1758; Apatura suspirans (Poda, 1761); Apatura junonia (Borkhausen, 1788); Papilio rubescens Esper, 1781; Apatura iris f. jole (Denis & Schiffermüller, 1775); Apatura pallas Leech, 1890; Apatura iris f. chrysina Oberthür, 1909; Papilio beroe Fabricius, 1793; Apatura iris recidiva Stichel, [1909]

= Apatura iris =

Purple emperor

Species of butterfly

Apatura iris, the purple emperor, is a Palearctic butterfly of the family Nymphalidae.

== Description ==
Adults have dark brown wings with white bands and spots, and a small orange ring on each of the hindwings. Males have a wingspan of 70–80 millimetres (2.8–3.1 in), and have a purple-blue sheen caused by iridescence that the slightly larger (80–92 mm) females lack. The larvae (caterpillars) are green with white and yellow markings, and have two large "horns" at the anterior end and a smaller one at the posterior.

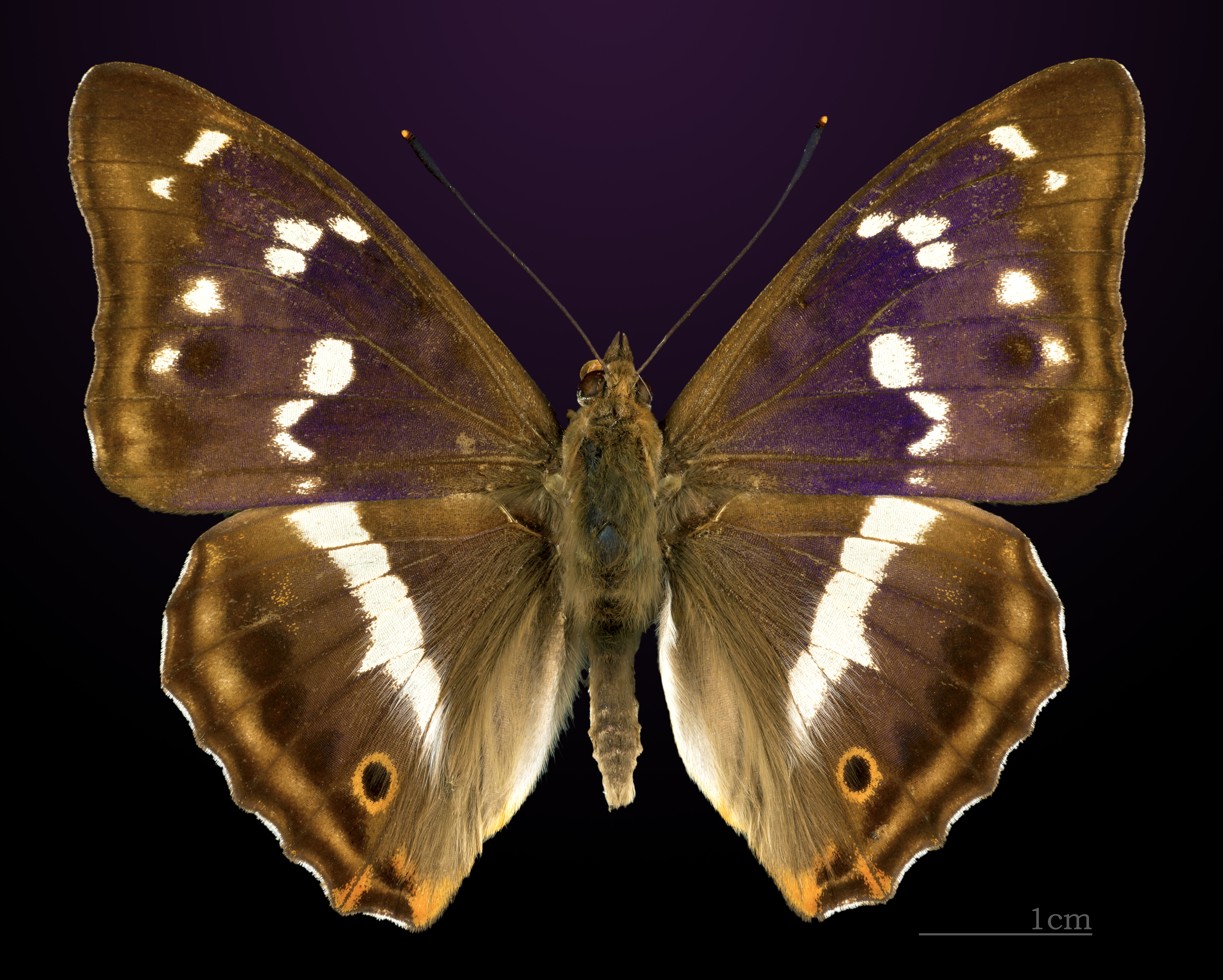
Dorsal side

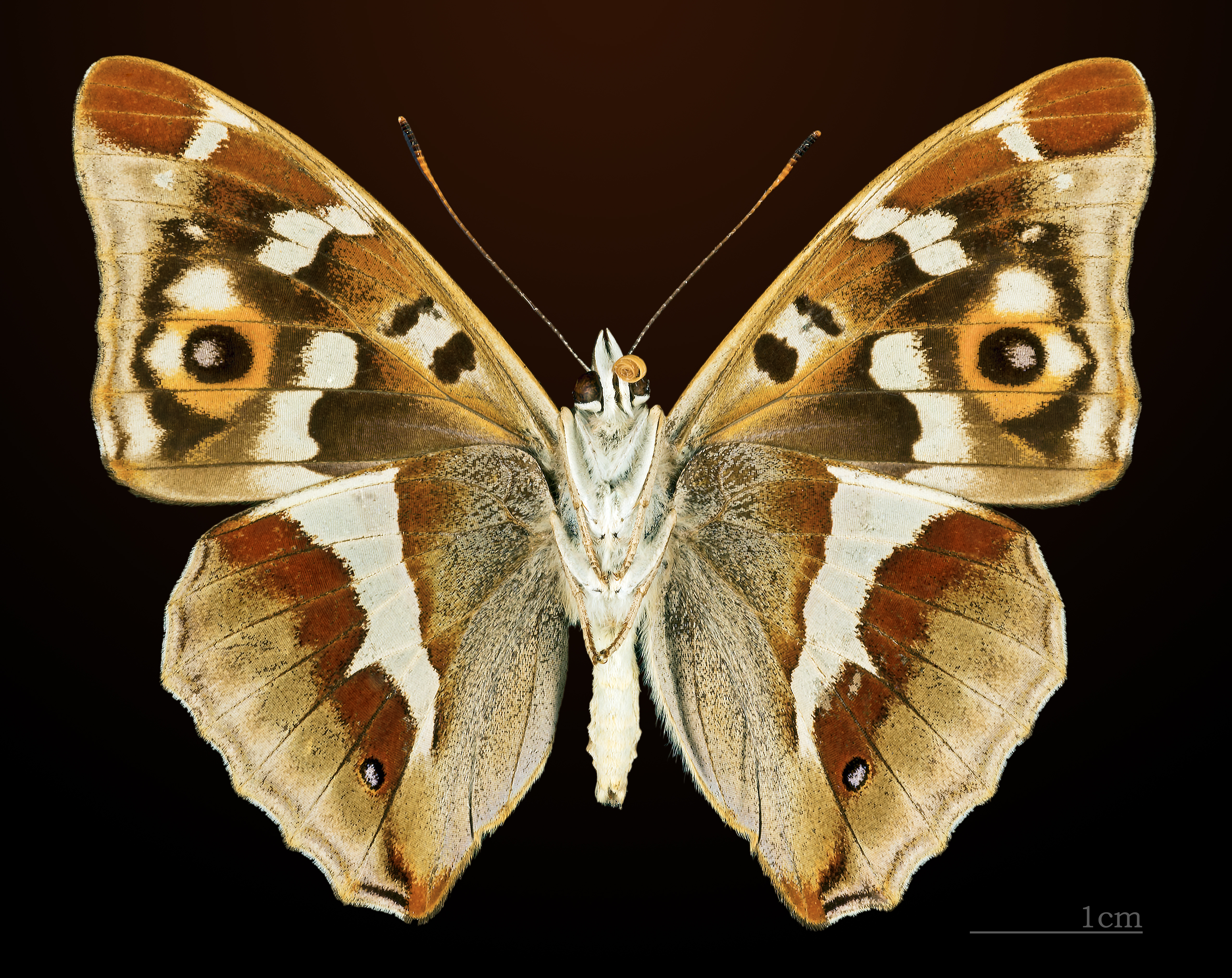
Ventral side

== Habits ==
Females spend most of their lives in the tree canopy, favouring dense and mature oak woodlands, coming down only to lay their eggs on the small willow bushes that grow in clearings and bridleways. Males also spend much of their time in the tree tops, defending their territory from rivals, though they will sometimes descend to drink from puddles or feed. Unlike most butterflies, the purple emperor does not feed from flowers but instead on the honeydew secreted by aphids, sap oozing from oak trees, and on dung, urine, and animal carcasses.

Richard South noted that collectors once used animal carcasses "in a somewhat advanced state of decay" to lure the males down to the ground, adding that this practice was "unsportsmanlike"; otherwise one needed a "high net" mounted on a pole about 14 or 15 feet (about 4.5 metres) in length to capture them. Heslop et al. noted that the males' penchant for roadkill can often cause them to be killed by cars.

== Life cycle ==
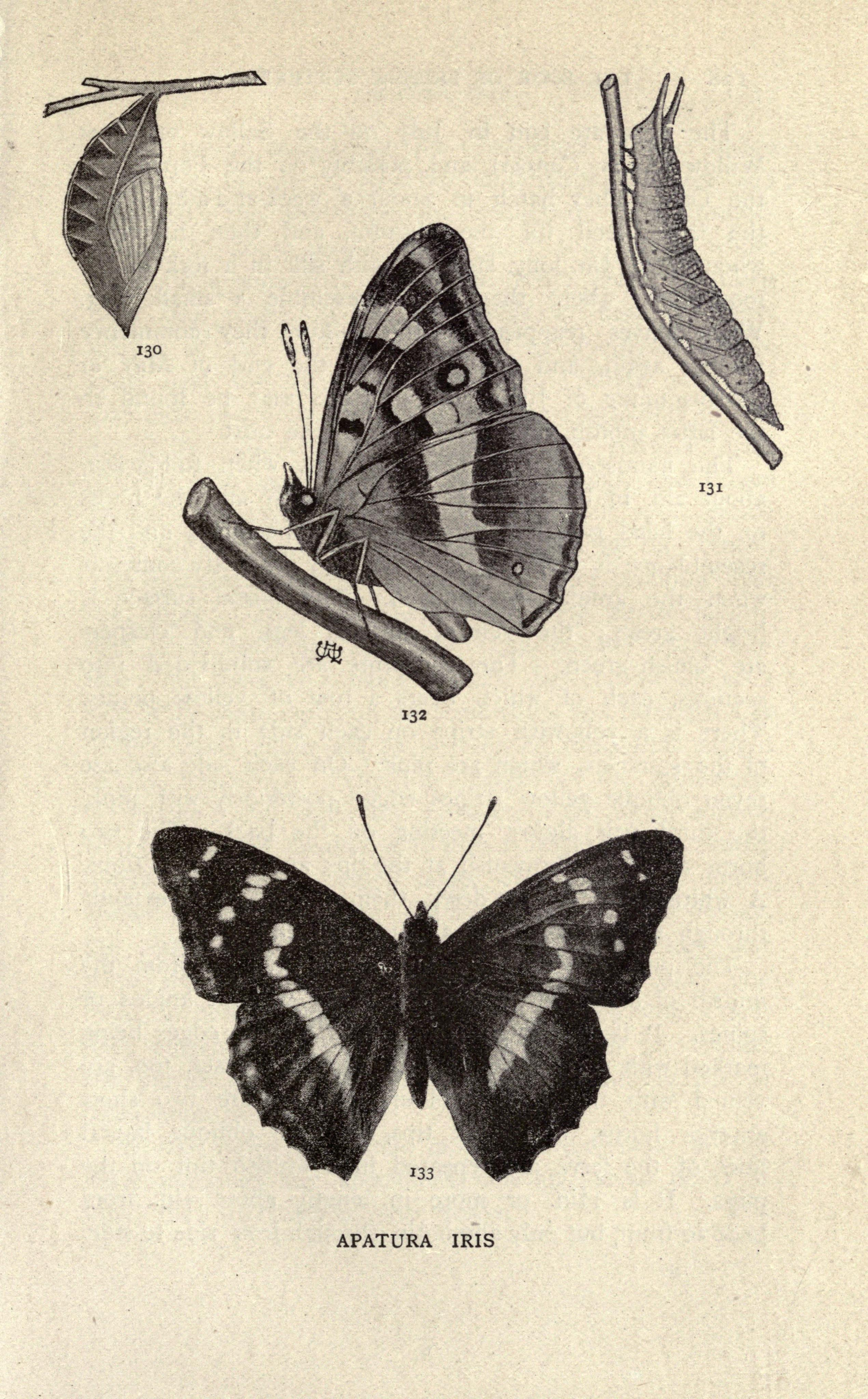
Lifecycle of purple emperor (from W.J. Lucas. (1893). The book of British butterflies : a practical manual for collectors and naturalists.)

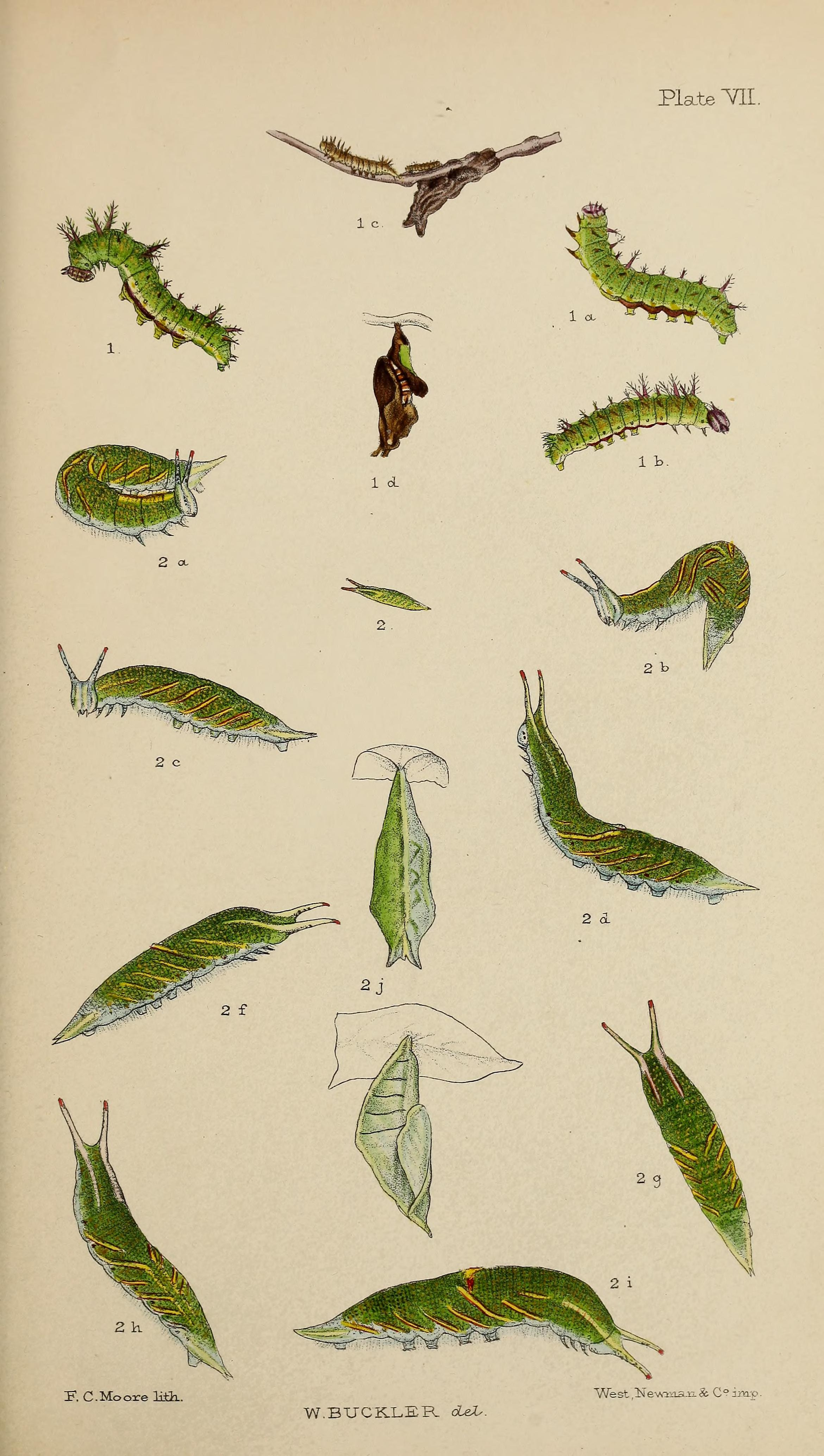
Figs 2 larva after 1st moult 2a, 2b, 2c larva after 4th moult 2d, 2e, 2f, 2g, 2h, 2i after 5th moult in different positions 2j pupa front view and side view

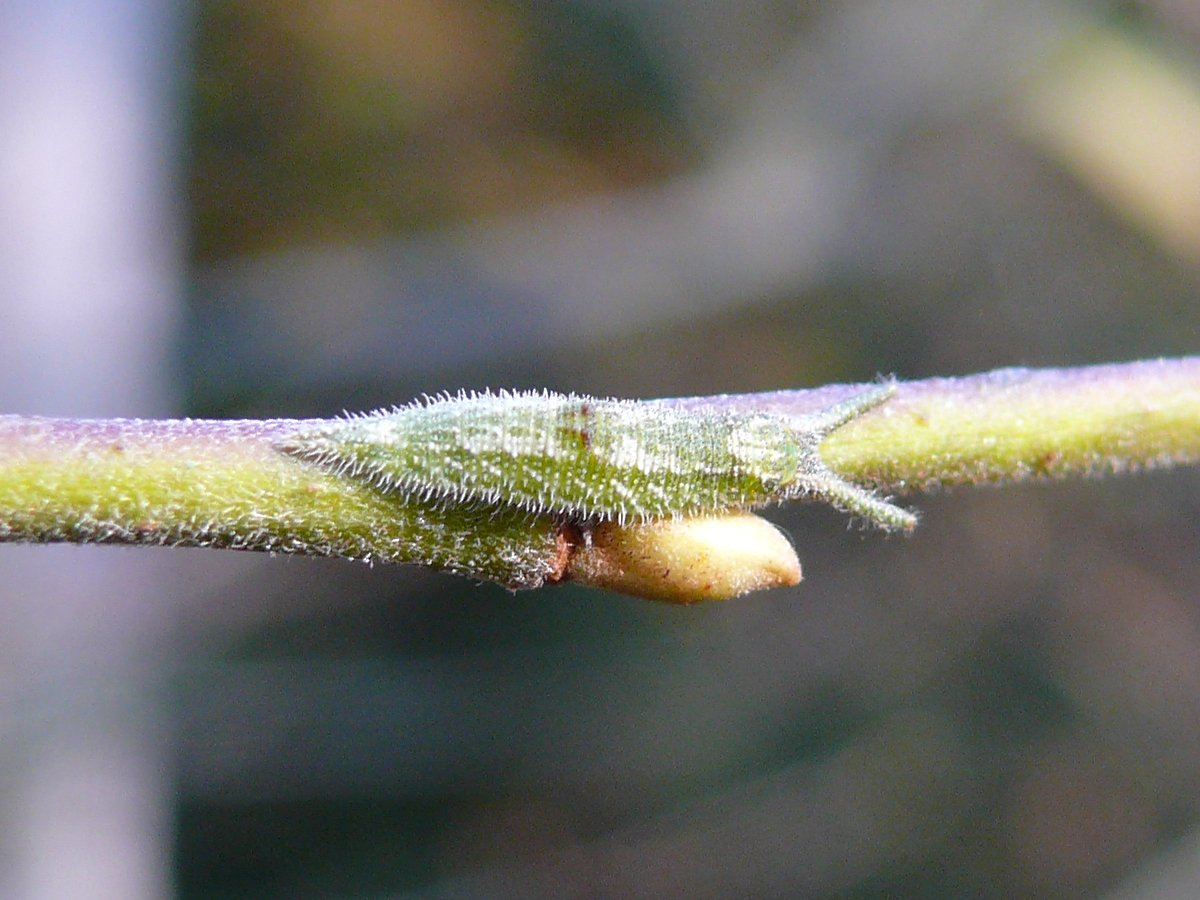
Caterpillar of purple emperor

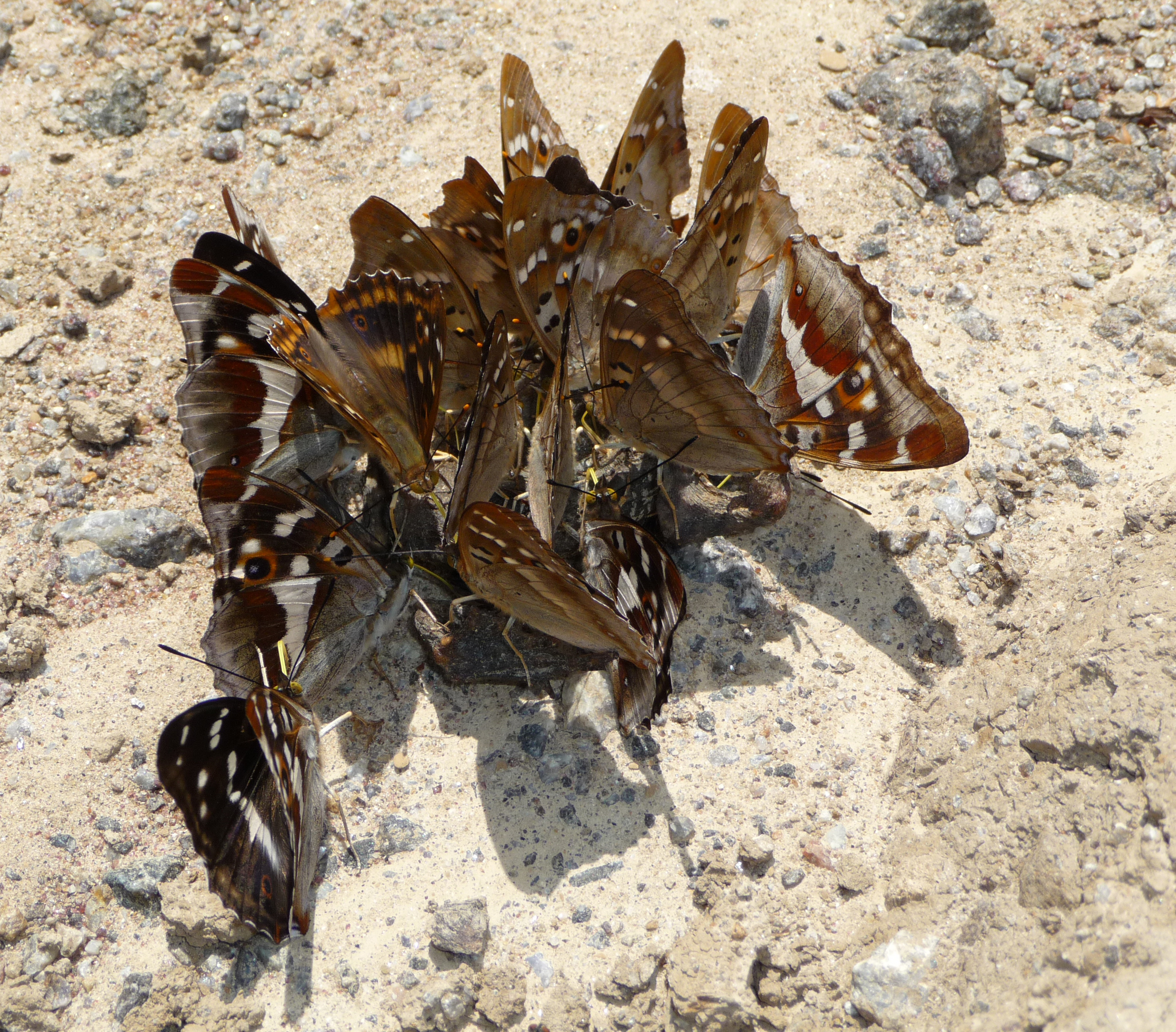
Purple emperors (Apatura iris) and lesser purple emperors (Apatura ilia) sucking moisture from the body of a dead European brown frog (Rana temporaria) in Ukraine.

They lay eggs in late summer on the upperside of sallow leaves, preferring the broad-leaved sallow, Salix caprea, but they will also use the narrow-leaved sallow, Salix atrocinerea, and various species of poplar. (Poplar is a more common food plant in continental Europe than in the British Isles.) After hatching, the larvae will lie along the midrib of the leaf where they are well camouflaged, and feed only at night. During the winter they hibernate in the forks of sallow branches, where they change colour from green to brown to match their surroundings. (The larvae are variously stated to be reach 35–40 mm long when fully fed or 55–56 mm; it is hard to give definitive measurements, given that they lack a rigid structure.) The following June they form a pale green chrysalis, 30–35 mm long and 12–15 mm in width, resembling a leaf shoot. The adults usually emerge in July, flying well into August.

== Distribution ==
Apatura iris is widely distributed in dense, broadleaved woodlands throughout Europe including southern Britain, and across the Palearctic to central and western China. Different subspecies are found across the region (see below).

=== British Isles ===
In Victorian times this species was regarded as being common in southern England, as far north as the river Humber, but since then it has experienced a sharp decline in both range and numbers. This decline started in the first part of the twentieth century (it was noted by South, for example, writing in 1921) and by the 1960s it was relatively scarce, being confined to old broadleaved woodlands in a few counties in south-east England. Heslop et al. ascribed the decline to habitat fragmentation and loss, starting before the First World War but accelerated by the increased demand for timber during that war, causing old woodlands to be clear felled to make way for commercial forestry crops, especially softwoods. This rendered large parts of its former habitat unsuitable, and it died out in those areas. This process continued after the Second World War for the same reason. Heslop estimated from his personal observation that "the minimum number of individual imagines (adults) required to sustain a viable colony in an average year is one thousand"; independent confirmation of this has not been found.

South believed that once they had become uncommon, increased collecting had contributed "to the monarch's destruction" in many areas. By 1989 the species had a stronghold in the remaining large broadleaved woodlands of Hampshire, Surrey and Sussex, but was still found in scattered localities elsewhere across southern England. It has returned in large numbers to the Knepp estate in Sussex following re-wilding, as described by Isabella Tree.

South noted that it had not been recorded from Scotland, and only doubtfully from Ireland, adding that "in Wales it is only found in Monmouthshire."

== Subspecies ==
- Apatura iris iris
- Apatura iris bieti Oberthür, 1885 (Tibet, western and central China)
- Apatura iris xanthina Oberthür, 1909
- Apatura iris kansuensis O. Bang-Haas, 1933
- Apatura iris amurensis Stichel, [1909] (Amur, Ussuri)

== Cultural reference ==
A specimen of Apatura iris plays a key role in solving a murder mystery in Robert W. Chambers' 1897 short story, "The Purple Emperor." The species is also mentioned in Tolkien's The Hobbit, in chapter 8, "Flies and Spiders". Compton Mackenzie mentions decline in numbers and them feeding on carcass in The Darkening Green.
