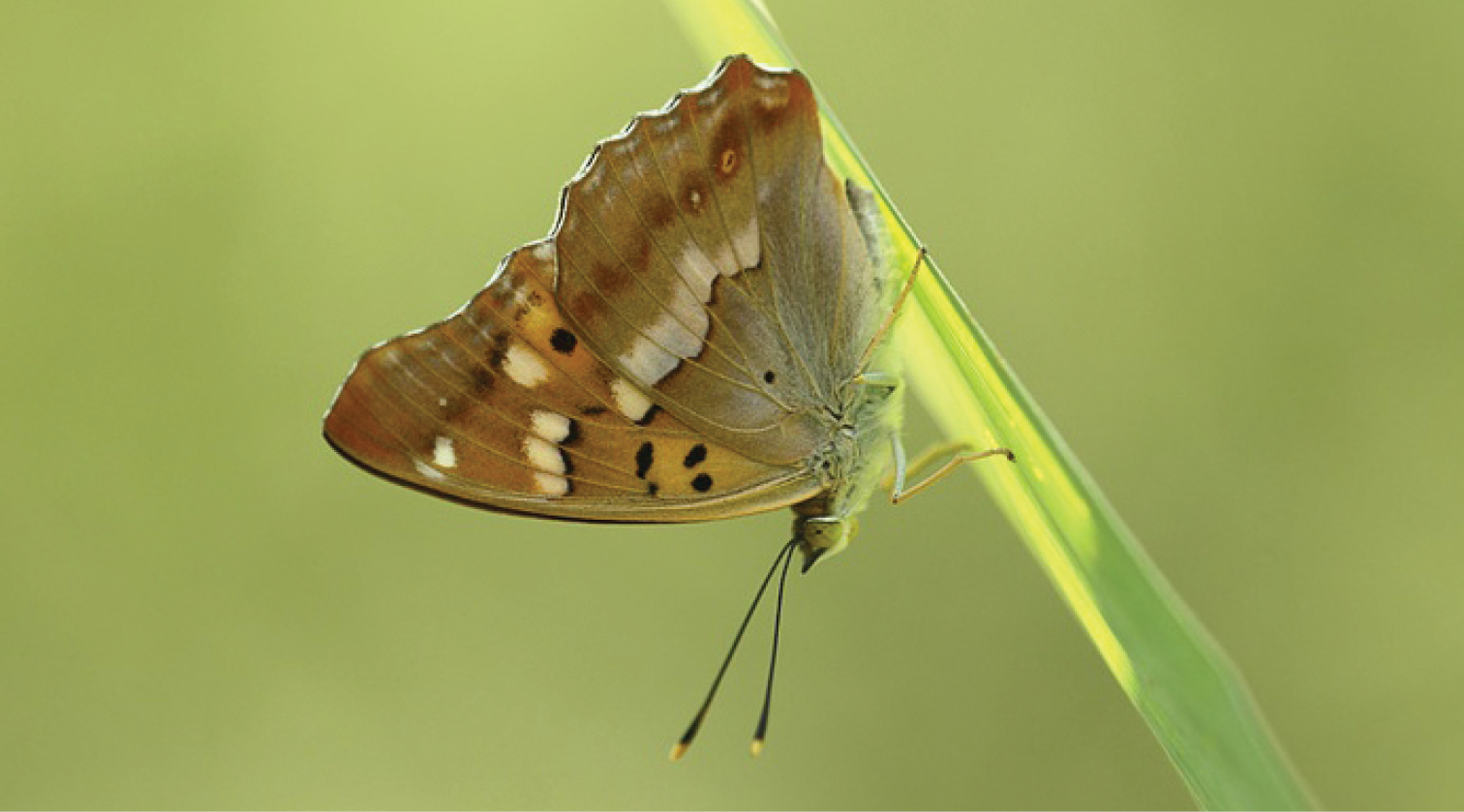

Scientific classification
- Kingdom: Animalia
- Phylum: Arthropoda
- Clade: Pancrustacea
- Class: Insecta
- Order: Lepidoptera
- Family: Nymphalidae
- Genus: Apatura
- Species: A. metis

Binomial name
- Apatura metis Freyer, 1829

= Apatura metis =

Freyer's purple emperor

Species of butterfly

Apatura metis, the Freyer's purple emperor, is a species of butterfly found in the Palearctic.

== Appearance ==
Freyer's purple emperor has dark wings with reddish and yellow bands. The wings of the male are bluish purple if seen from the right angle. In appearance, it resembles Apatura ilia. However, it differs significantly from it by a stepped protrusion in the middle of the outer edge of the postdiscal band of the hindwings. The ground colour of the wings above is usually dark brown, with a light orange postdiscal band, an orange marginal band, and a field of the same colour in the median cell of the forewings. A blind ocellus is located in the anal corner of the fore and hind wings. There are four dark spots within the light field of the median cell of the forewings. Below, the wings are light, orange-brown, with a greenish coating. The body is large, dark, covered with reddish hairs above and white hairs below. The femora are white, the tibia and feet are reddish. The palps are pointed to the apex. Antennae are long, dark, with rufous margins below, at the base and at the ends of the clubs. The wings of males with a purple tint of their main background. For the Seitz account of metis see Apatura ilia

== Systematics ==
Freyer's purple emperor belongs to the genus Apatura, subfamily Apaturinae. The species is divided into seven subspecies:

- Apatura metis metis (Freyer, 1829) (south-eastern Europe)
- Apatura metis bunea (Herrich-Schäffer, 1845) (south-European Russia, Caucasus)
- Apatura metis substituta (Butler, 1873) (Japan)
- Apatura metis irtyshika (Korshunov, 1982) (south-western Siberia, Kazakhstan)
- Apatura metis separata (Tuzov, 2000) (Transbaikalia)
- Apatura metis heijona (Matsumura, 1928) (Korea, Amur and Ussuri regions)
- Apatura metis doii (Matsumura, 1928) (Kurile islands)

== Habitat and ecology ==
Freyer's purple emperor usually inhabits forests and is often found nearby rivers and streams. The female spends the majority of her life in the foliage. The largest habitat of the animal is the Gemenc forest in southern Hungary. Although it is one of the rarest animals in Europe, it can be seen in large quantities there. In Europe, Freyer's purple emperor usually has one, sometimes two generations, the first in May and June, the second in July and August. The caterpillars feed on willow species.

This species is stoutly protected in Europe. The nominal worth of a single specimen is HUF50,000, which equals about US$238.

== Gallery ==
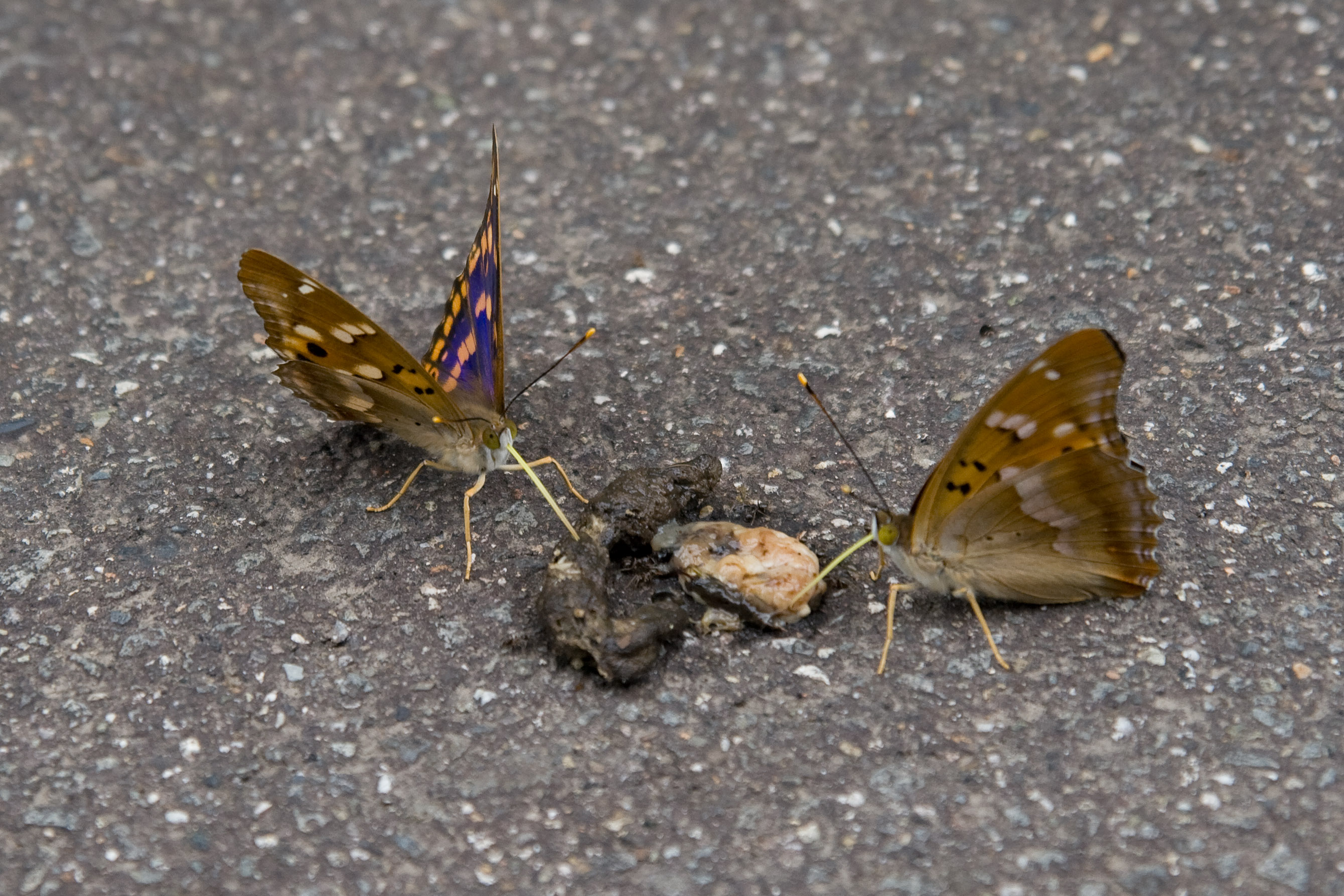
Apatura metis substituta on Mount Kirigamine, Japan

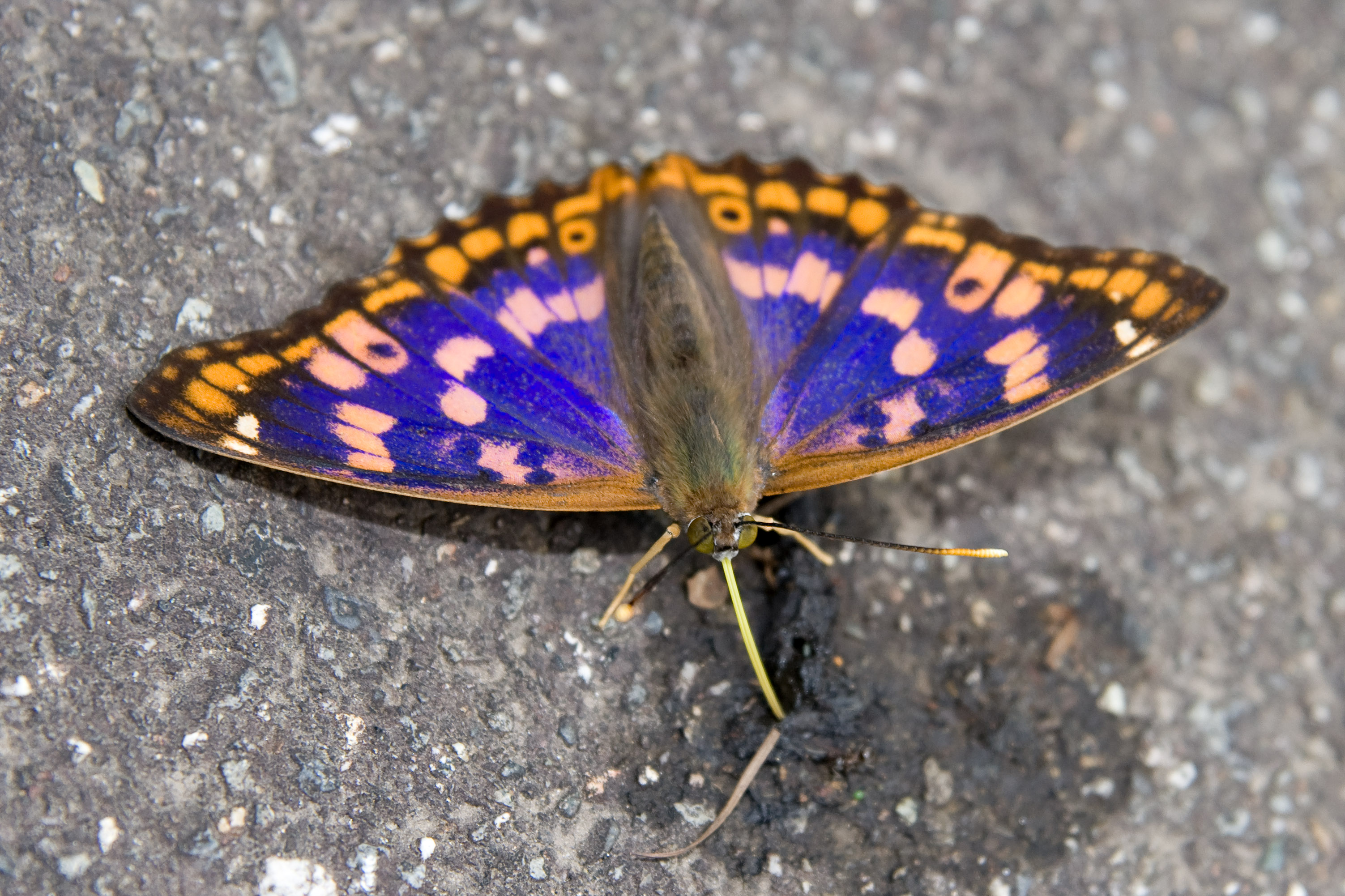
