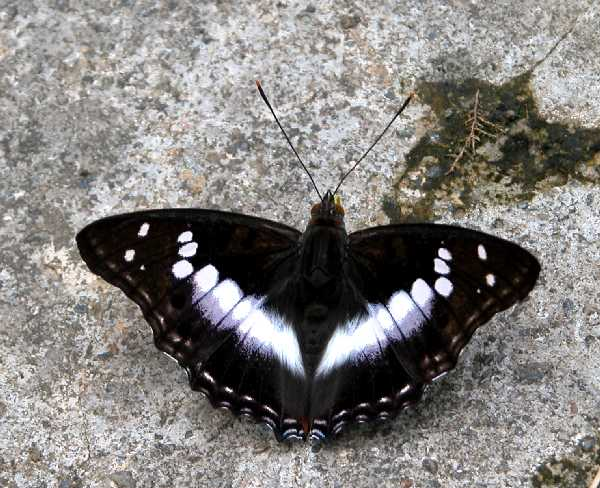

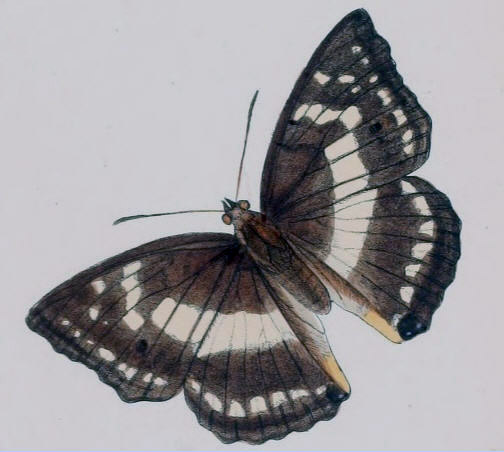

Scientific classification
- Kingdom: Animalia
- Phylum: Arthropoda
- Clade: Pancrustacea
- Class: Insecta
- Order: Lepidoptera
- Family: Nymphalidae
- Genus: Mimathyma
- Species: M. ambica

Binomial name
- Mimathyma ambica (Kollar, 1844)

Synonyms
- Apatura ambica

= Mimathyma ambica =

Indian purple emperor

Species of butterfly

Mimathyma ambica, the Indian purple emperor, is a species of nymphalid butterfly found in Asia.

== Description ==
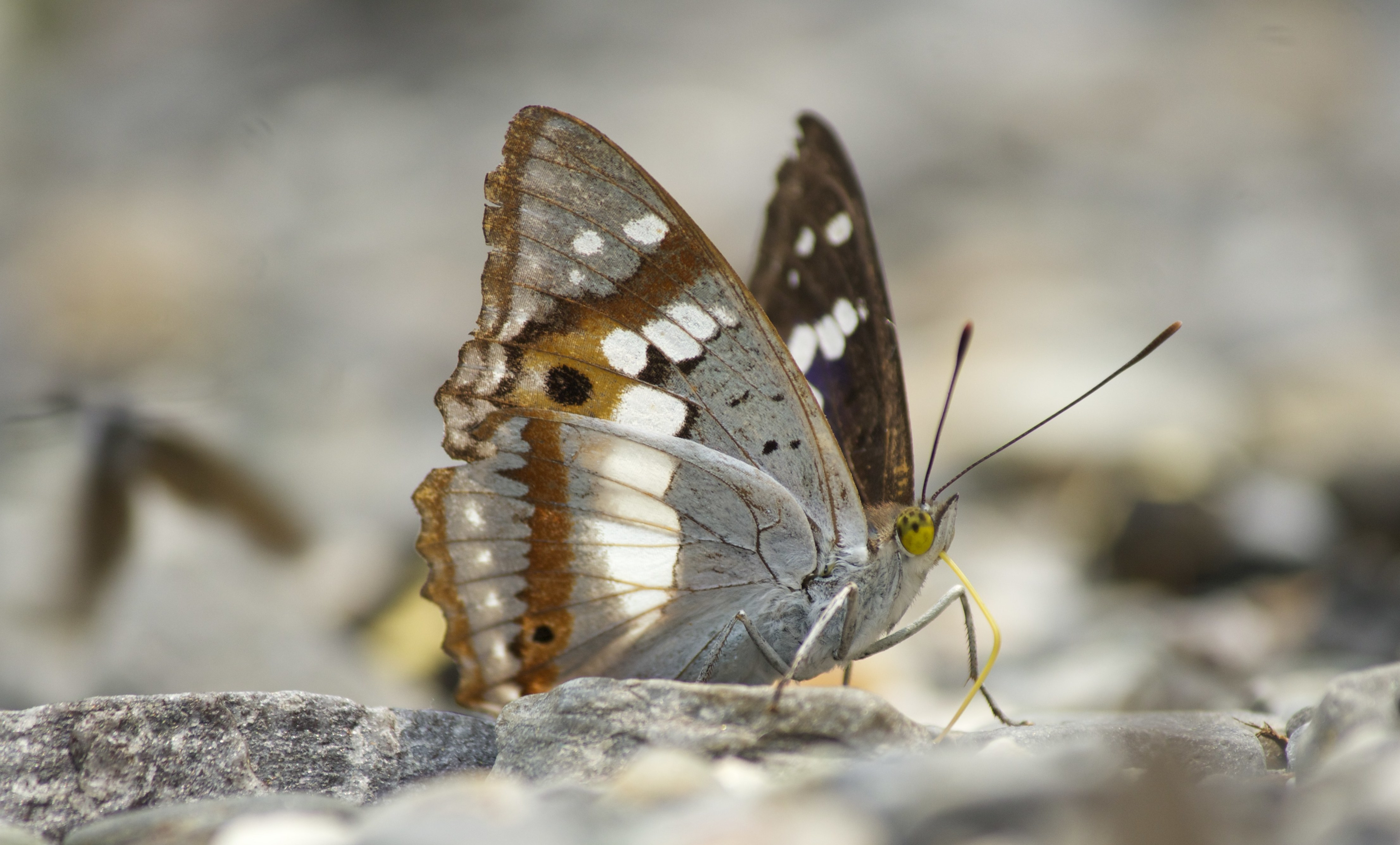
In Buxa Tiger Reserve, West Bengal, India

=== Male ===
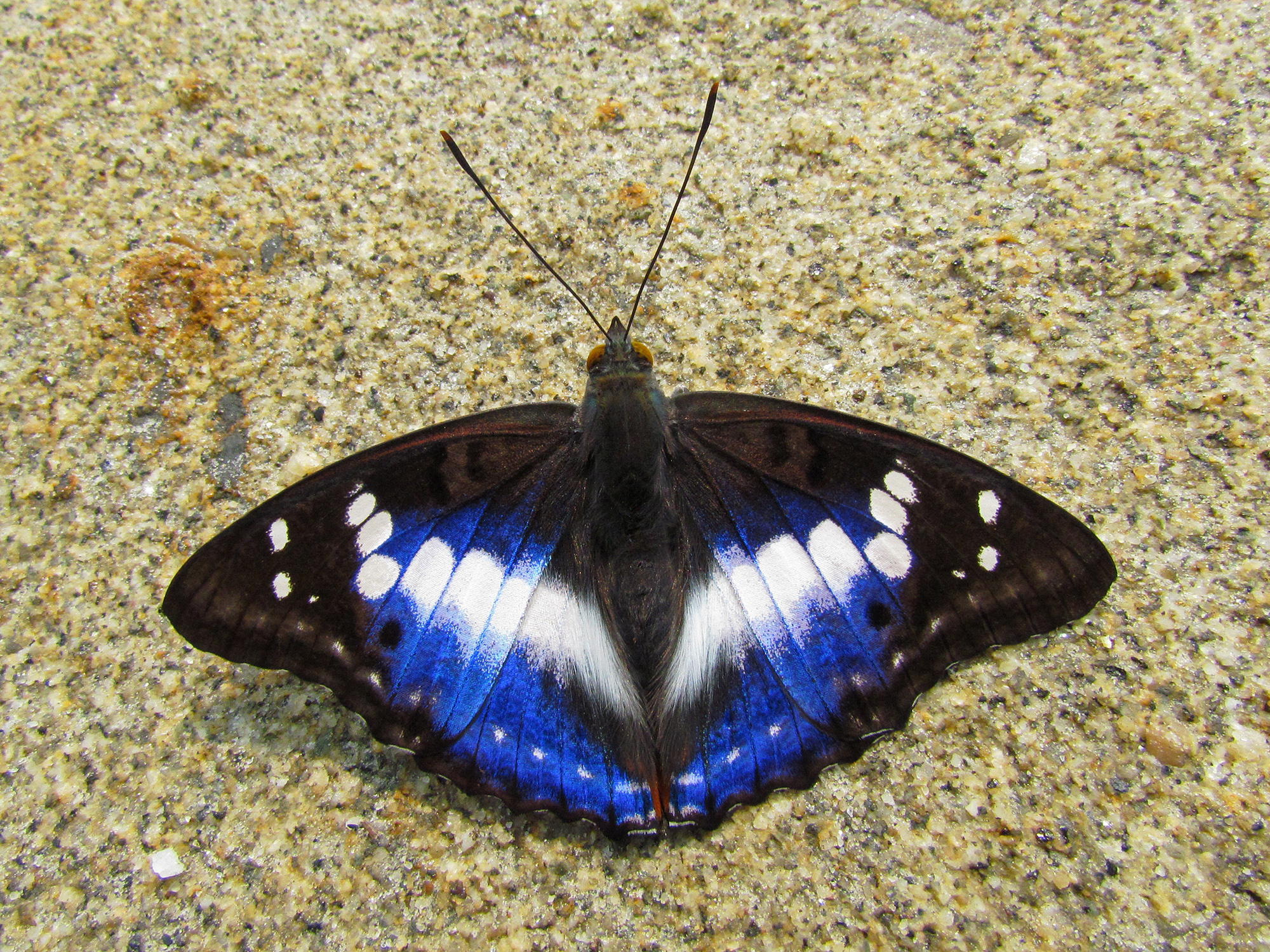

The upperside is brownish black; a broad white, inwardly angled, central band goes from vein 3 of the forewing to vein 1 of the hindwing. This band IS bordered broadly on both sides by iridescent blue and anteriorly meeting 3 white outwardly angled spots in interspaces 3, 4, 5.

Three preapical small spots and an obscure subterminal series of dots are on the fore, and a better defined, slightly curved, subterminal series of spots are on the hindwing, all white, also on the latter wing are one apical and one tornal fulvous-yellow spot.

The underside is pearly bluish white, the discal band and spots of the upperside showing through pinkish white, the discal spots and band on the forewing are bordered interiorly with black, and some black marks are in the cell.

On the forewing is an oblique somewhat wavy postdiscal, and a more even broad, rich brown terminal band. The former ends at the tornus in a yellowish-orange patch bearing a black spot with black outer markings. The latter is white-spotted at the tornal angle. The hindwing has postdiscal straight and terminal broad bands of the same rich brown, a black white-bordered subtornal spot, and another in interspace 2 placed on the brown postdiscal band. The antennae is brown; the head, thorax and abdomen are brown above and white beneath.

=== Female ===
Similar to the male with similar markings, but the ground colour above is dusky brown, with yellowish white markings.

== See also ==
- List of butterflies of India
- List of butterflies of India (Nymphalidae)
