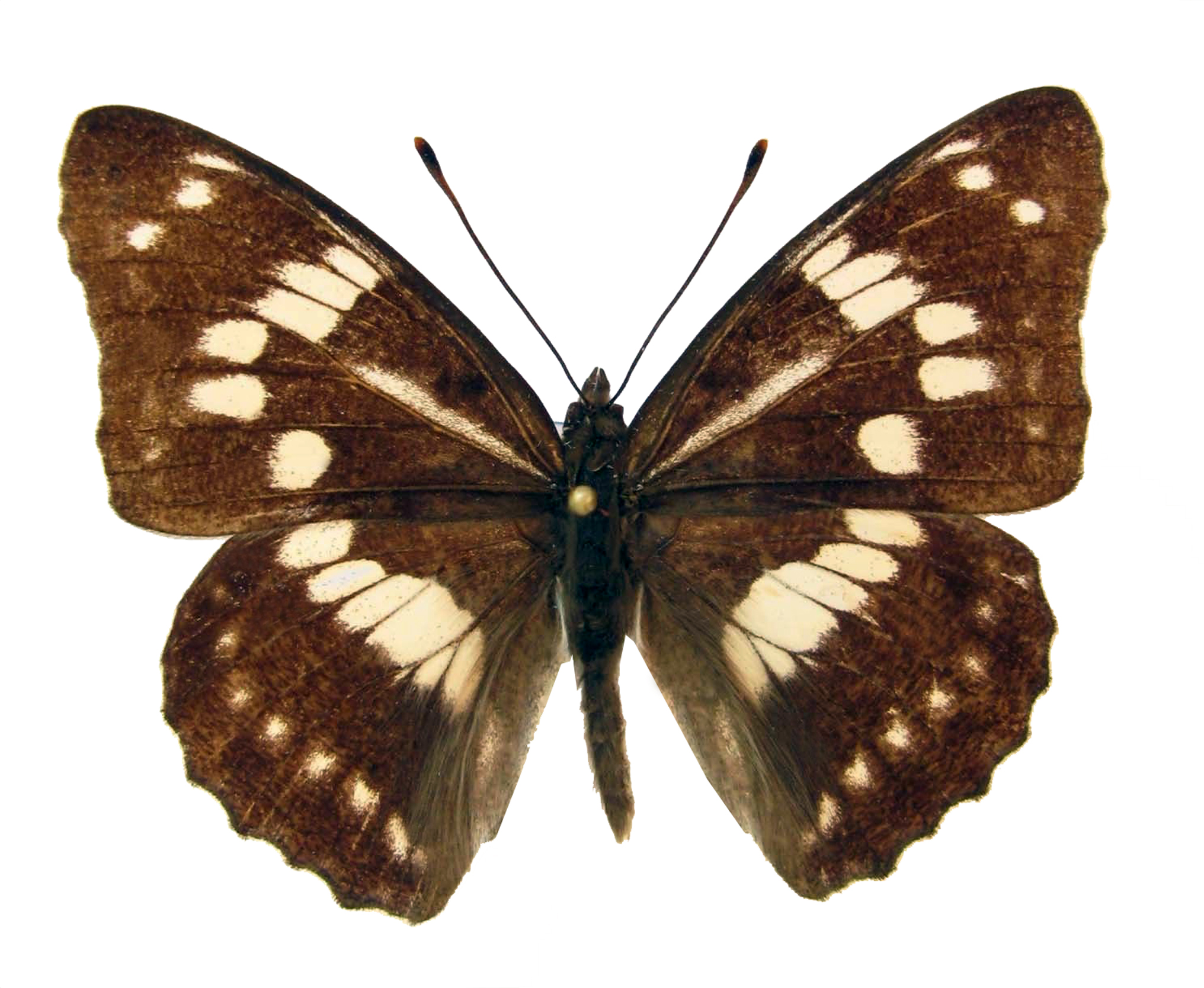

Scientific classification
- Domain: Eukaryota
- Kingdom: Animalia
- Phylum: Arthropoda
- Class: Insecta
- Order: Lepidoptera
- Family: Nymphalidae
- Genus: Mimathyma
- Species: M. nycteis

Binomial name
- Mimathyma nycteis (Ménétriès, 1859)

Synonyms
- Atyma nycteis Ménétriés, 1859; Atyma cassiope Ménétriés, 1859; Apatura nycteis f. furukawai Matsumura, 1931

= Mimathyma nycteis =

Species of butterfly

Mimathyma nycteis is a butterfly found in the East Palearctic (Amurland, Korea, Northeast China) that belongs to the browns family.

== Description from Seitz ==
A. nycteis Men. (51c) has less elongate wings than the preceding species [Chitoria ulupi|A. fulva], differing very considerably from the same, resembling certain species of the genus Athyma on the upperside, especially in the cell of the forewing bearing a white longitudinal streak along the median vein. Underside violet-brown, with the markings of the upperside reappearing, but partly widened and of a white colour which has almost a mother-of-pearl gloss; in the basal area of the hindwing there is anteriorly a long curved white spot, between the middle band and the submarginal row of spots there is a row of bluish white spots in the dark ground-colour. Female similar to male larger, rarely with a row of red-brown spots near the outer margin of the hindwing. An apparently rare form of this species is ab. cassiope Men. (51c), in which the white spots in the central area of the forewing are so much enlarged as to form an almost continuous, broad, strongly curved band; the middle band of the hindwing, too, is essentially dilated. Larva slug-like, dark green, laterally with light oblique stripes, segments 6—12 each with 2 thorny processes, those on segments 6, 8 and 11 being longer and thicker than the others, at the apex of the body 2 long, pointed processes; on the head 2 long thorny horns, which terminate each in 2 roundish knobs directed forward; head and back with single small short thorns, which are longest on the sides of the head, where they also stand more closely together; the parts of the body ventrally of the spiracles clothed with minute yellowish hairs; ventral surface paler than the back; length of the adult larva 52 mm. In June on Elm. Pupa whitish green like that of ilia and iris, but bearing a row of obtuse tubercles on the sharply keeled dorsal side of the abdomen (according to Graeser). — Amurland, Ussuri, Sutchan, Corea.

== Biology ==
The larva feeds on Ulmus propinga, Ulmus pumila.

== See also ==
- List of butterflies of Russia
