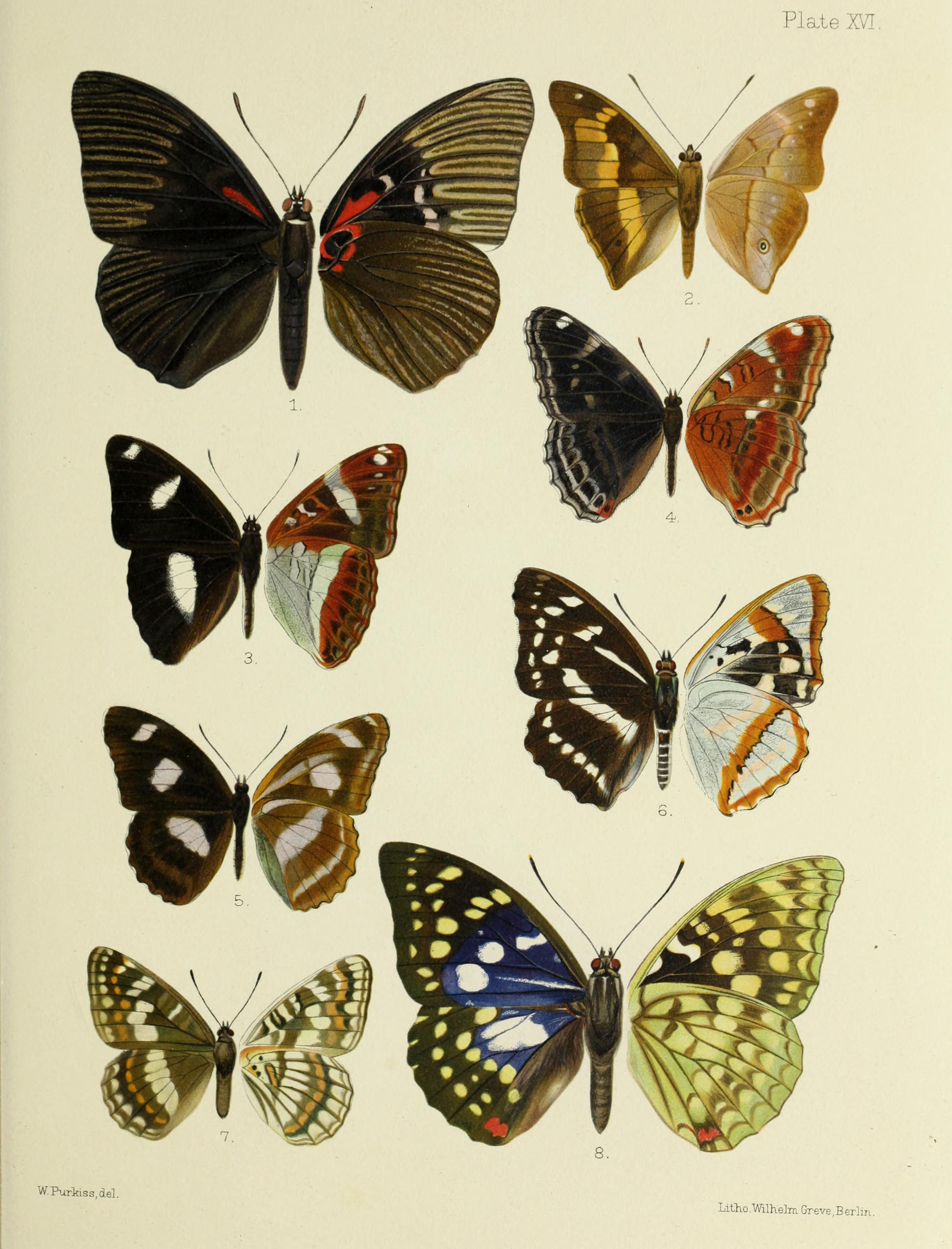
- Mimathyma chevana in Butterflies from China, Japan, and Corea (figure 6 as Apatura chevana

Scientific classification
- Domain: Eukaryota
- Kingdom: Animalia
- Phylum: Arthropoda
- Class: Insecta
- Order: Lepidoptera
- Family: Nymphalidae
- Genus: Mimathyma
- Species: M. chevana

Binomial name
- Mimathyma chevana (Moore, 1865)

= Mimathyma chevana =

Species of butterfly

Mimathyma chevana, the sergeant emperor, is an Indomalayan butterfly of the family Nymphalidae. The species was first described by Frederic Moore in 1865.

There are two subspecies:

- M. c. chevana Sikkim, Assam, northern Myanmar
- M. c. leechii Moore, [1896] western and central China

Mimathyma chevana mimics Athyma opalina.
