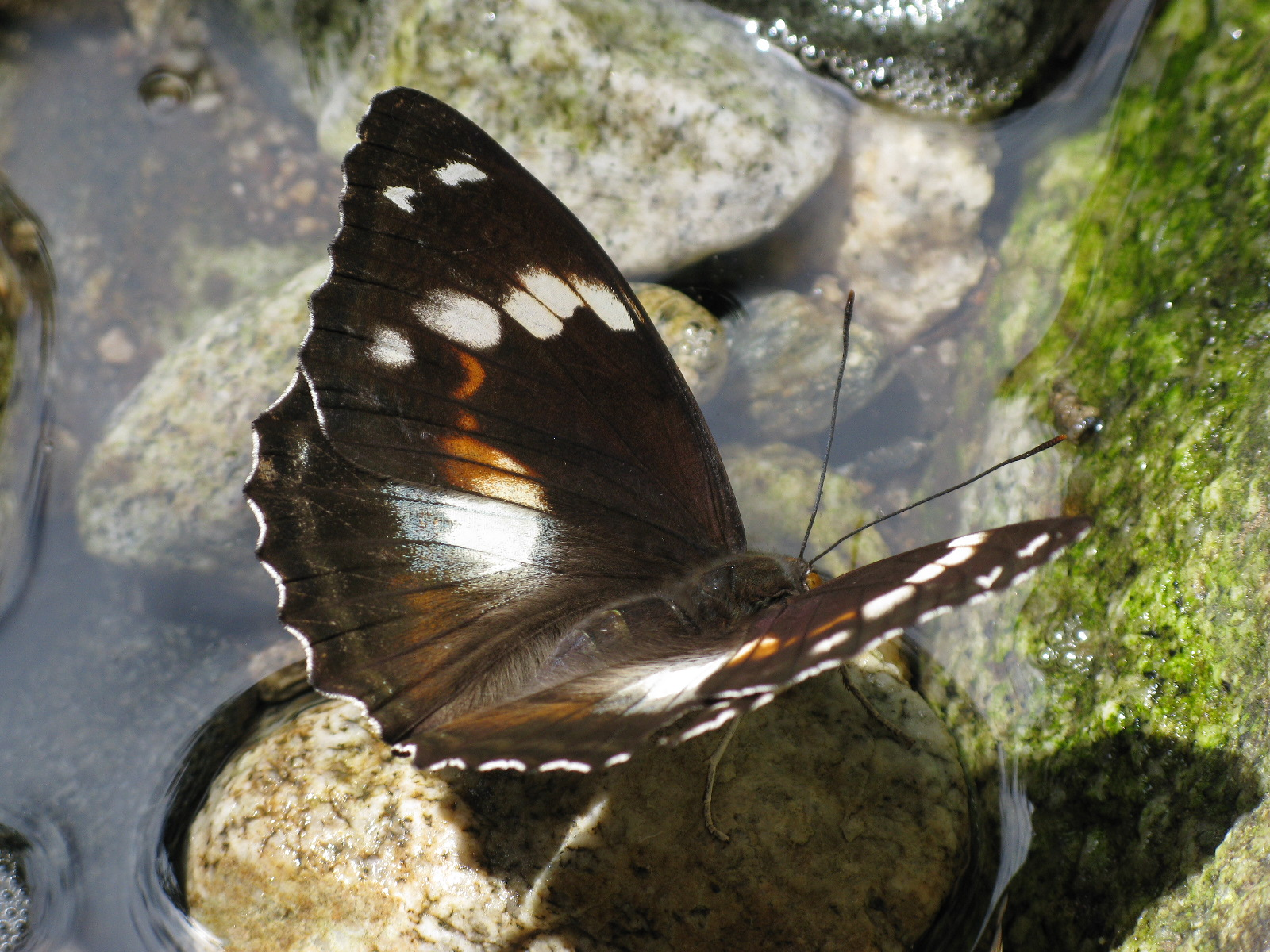

Scientific classification
- Kingdom: Animalia
- Phylum: Arthropoda
- Clade: Pancrustacea
- Class: Insecta
- Order: Lepidoptera
- Family: Nymphalidae
- Genus: Mimathyma
- Species: M. schrenckii

Binomial name
- Mimathyma schrenckii (Menetries, 1859)

Synonyms
- Adolias schrenckii Ménétriés, 1859; Apatura laeta Oberthür, 1906

= Mimathyma schrenckii =

Species of butterfly

Mimathyma schrenckii is a butterfly found in the East Palearctic (Amurland to Korea, Northeast China) that belongs to the Nymphalidae family.

== Subspecies ==
- M. s. schrenckii Amurland to Korea, north-eastern China
- M. s. laeta (Oberthür, 1906) Yunnan

== Description from Seitz ==
A. schrenckii Men. (51b). Upperside black-brown; markings of the forewing white, a spot at the hindmargin bluish, being connected with the white discal markings by a russet-red double spot situated in front of it; on the hindwing a very broad white band which is bordered all round by iridescent-blue scaling, at the distal margin a row of bluish white spots, the posterior ones being indistinct. The dark ground of both wings shot with blue in certain lights. Female larger, ground-colour duller, with a greenish sheen, before the hindmargin of the forewing an abbreviated brownish band instead of the bluish spot. The underside of the hindwing of both sexes light blue with silvery gloss, and with an olive-brown, black-edged transverse band and brown border. Larva pale green, in habitus similar to a very large larva of A. ilia and almost like that of nycteis; on the back of segments 5, 7 and 10 there are two wart-like tubercles which bear a small hook, at the apex of the body a fork formed of 2 thin processes, which are longer than in the European species of Apatura. On Ostrya. Pupa fastened on the upperside of a leaf, its shape and colour as in the allied species (according to Ruhl and Graser). — Amurland, Ussuri, Corea.

== Biology ==
The larva feeds on Ulmus japonica, Ulmus propinqua, U. laciniata, Carpinus cordata.

== See also ==
- List of butterflies of Russia
