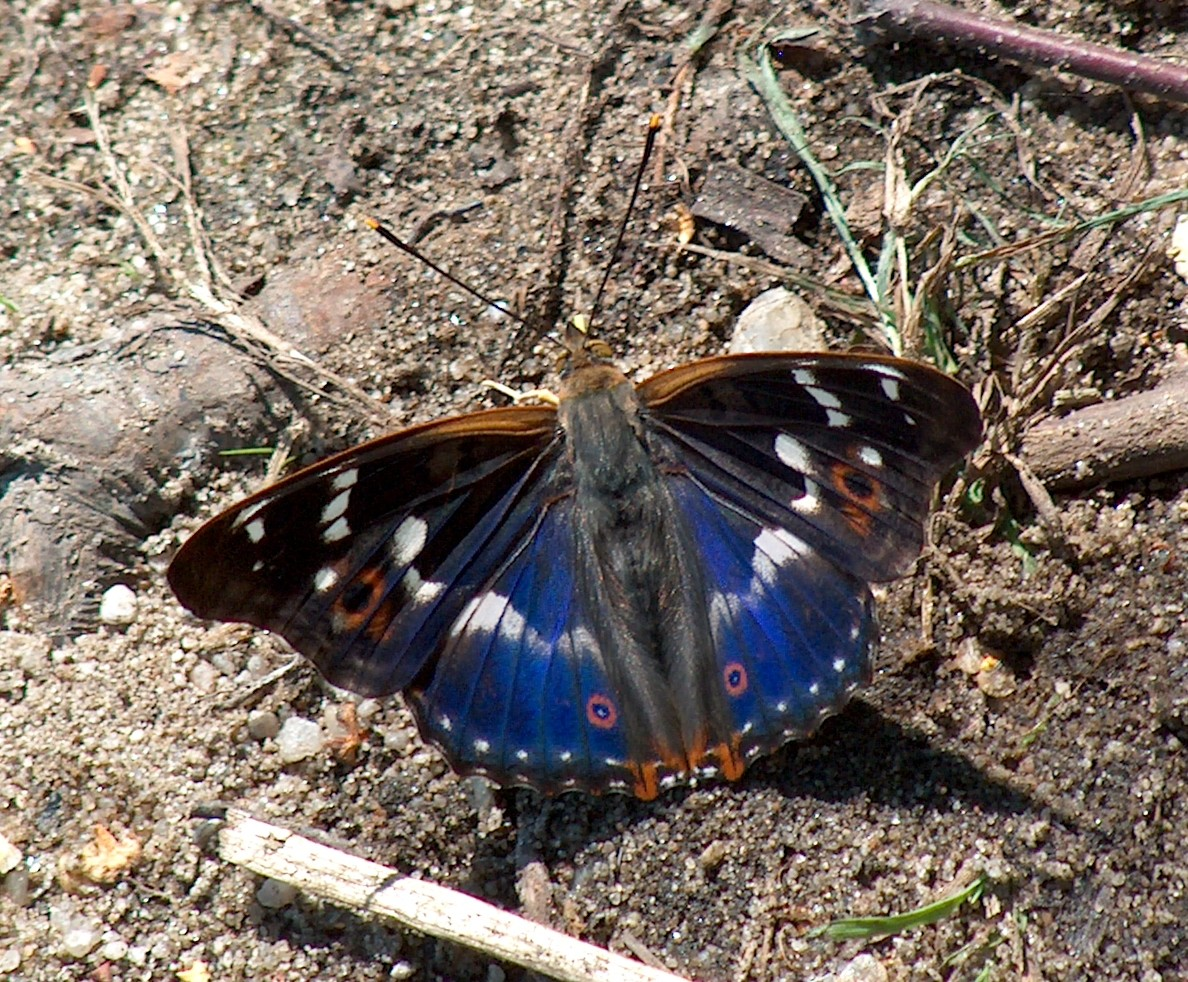
- A. i. ilia
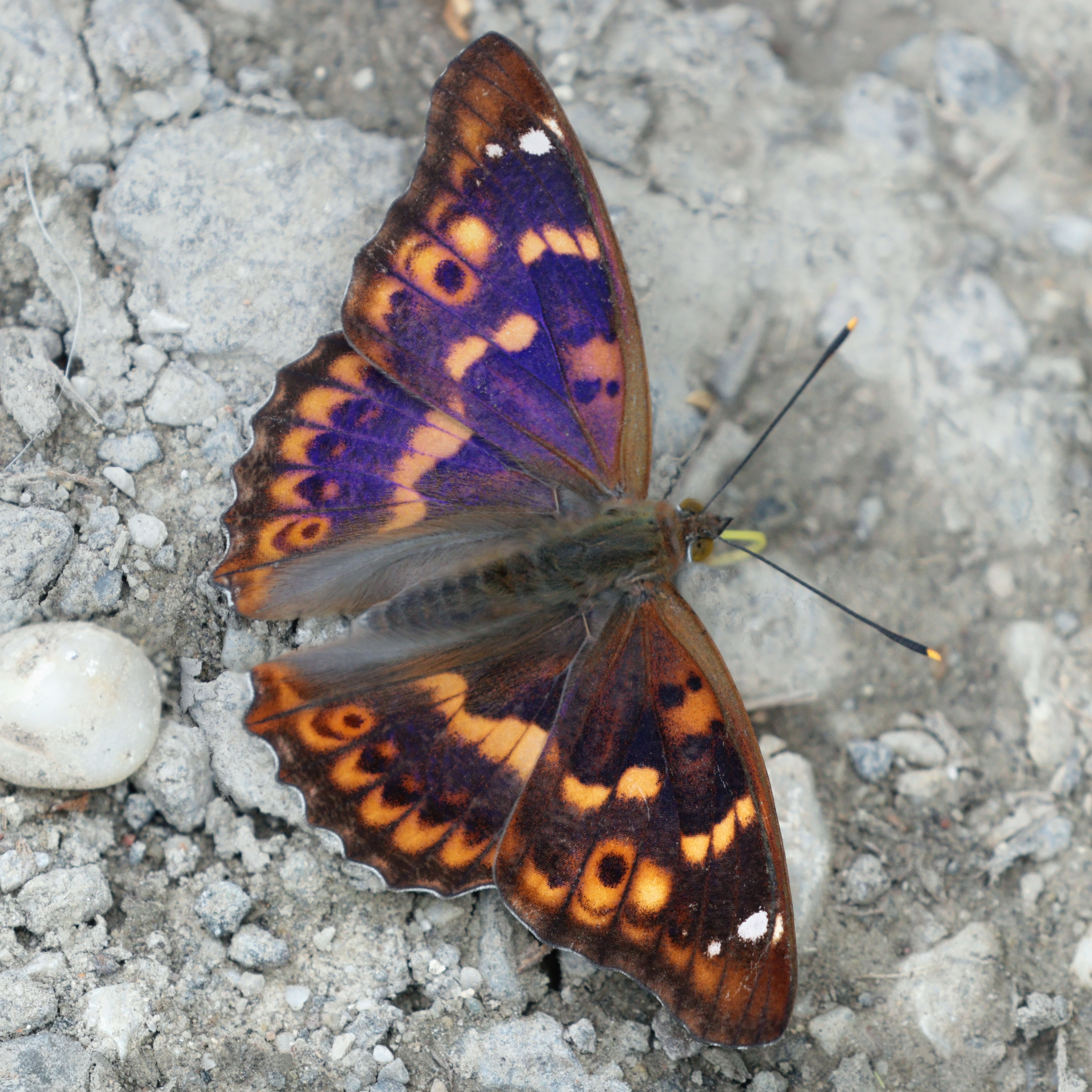
- A. i. ilia f. clytie, Hungary

Scientific classification
- Kingdom: Animalia
- Phylum: Arthropoda
- Class: Insecta
- Order: Lepidoptera
- Family: Nymphalidae
- Genus: Apatura
- Species: A. ilia

Binomial name
- Apatura ilia (Denis & Schiffermüller, 1775)

= Apatura ilia =

Species of butterfly

Apatura ilia, the lesser purple emperor, is a species of butterfly native to most of Europe and east across the Palearctic. It is named for its similarity to the purple emperor butterfly.

== Description ==
The wingspan is 55–60 mm (2.2–2.4 in) in the female and 60–70 mm (2.4–2.8 in) in the male. The upper side of the wings is dark brown, with metallic blue-violet hues in the male, and it has a clear postdiscal band on the hind wing and several light spots on the fore wing. These clear areas can be presented in two different aspects; they are white on the butterflies of the nominal form ilia, and clear fawn in the form clytie. For both forms, the fore wing also has an orange-coloured ocellus, which makes differentiating the species from Apatura iris possible. A similar ocellus is present on the hind wing in both species. The reverse side of the fore wing is brown and the back of the hind wing is dull brown with, as in A. iris, an orange ocellus centered in black.

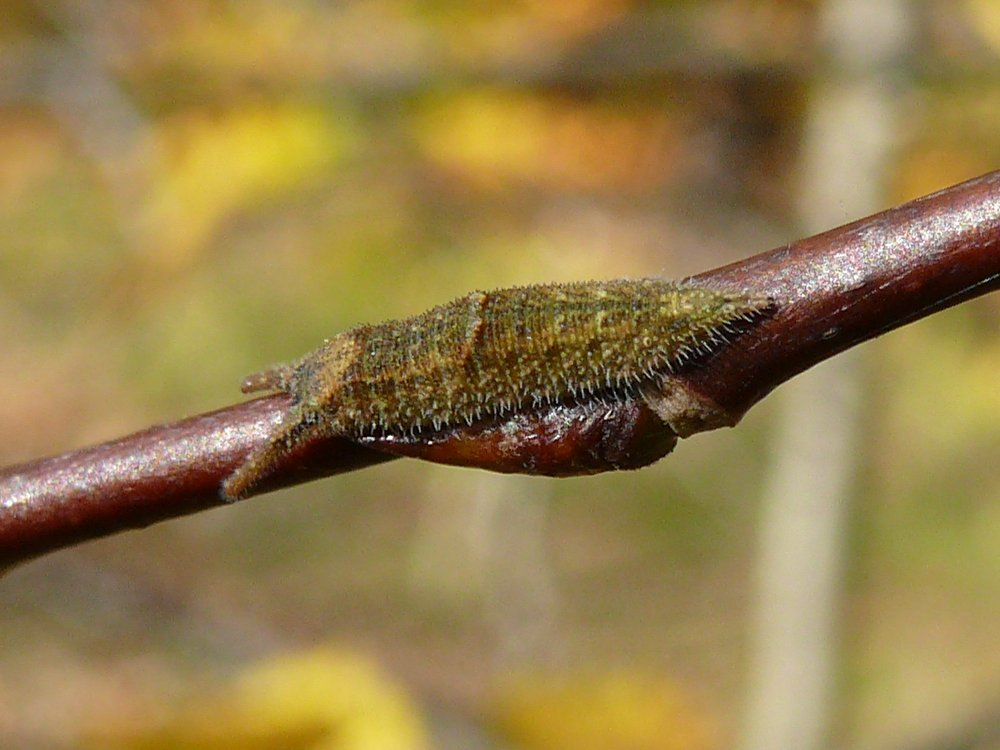
Caterpillar

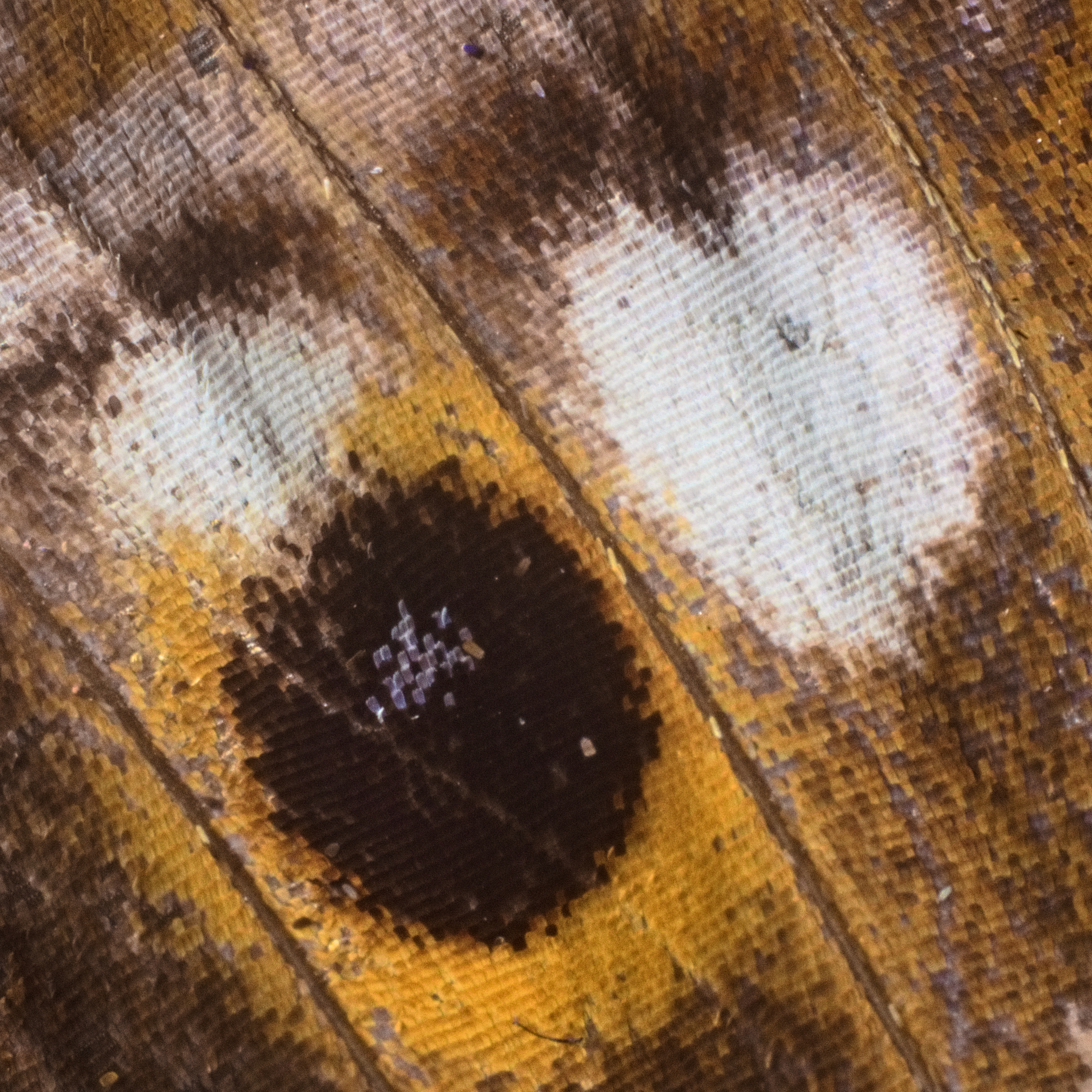
Black dot of Apatura ilia right fore wing, ventral side, male

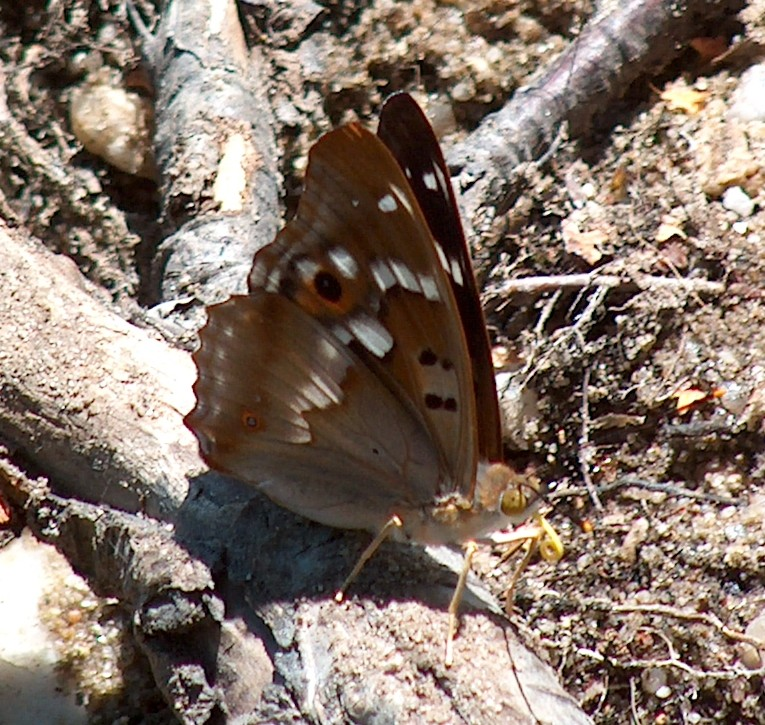
Germany

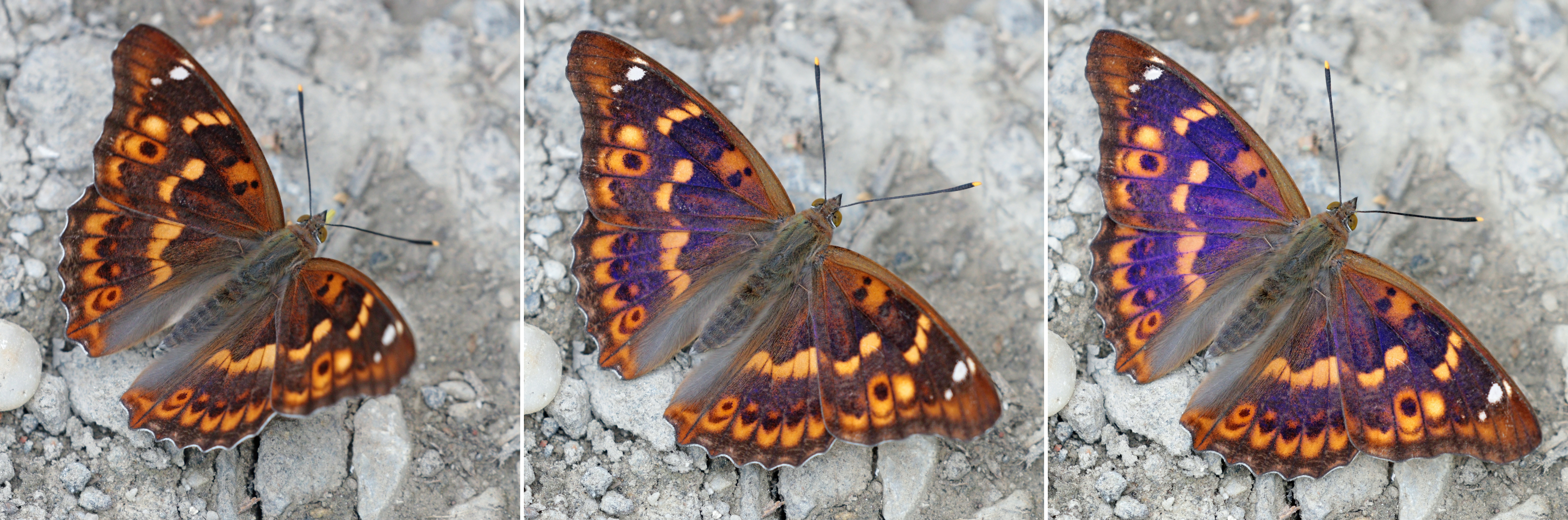
Composite A. i. ilia f. clytie, Hungary

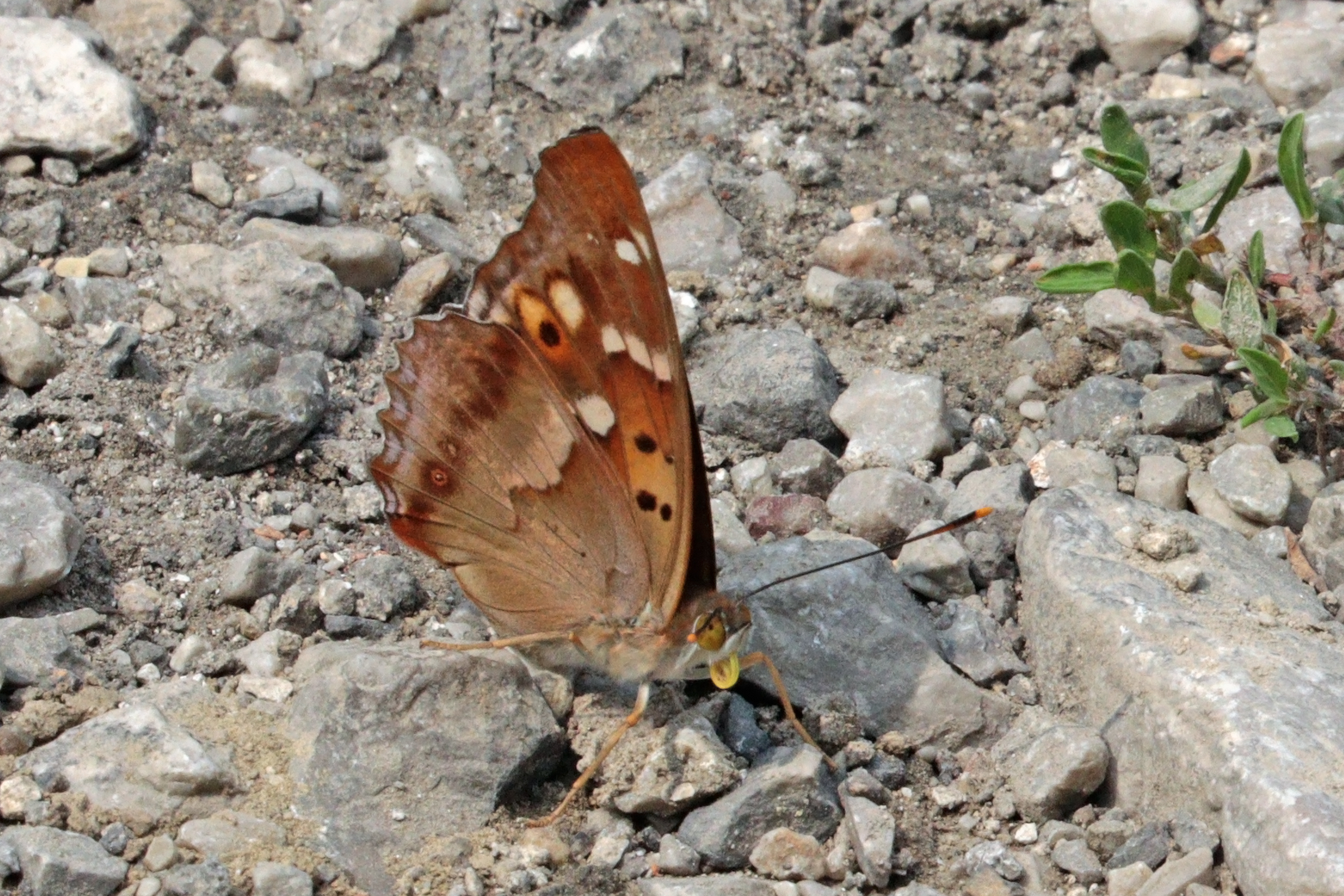
A. i. ilia f. clytie, Hungary

Mounted specimens

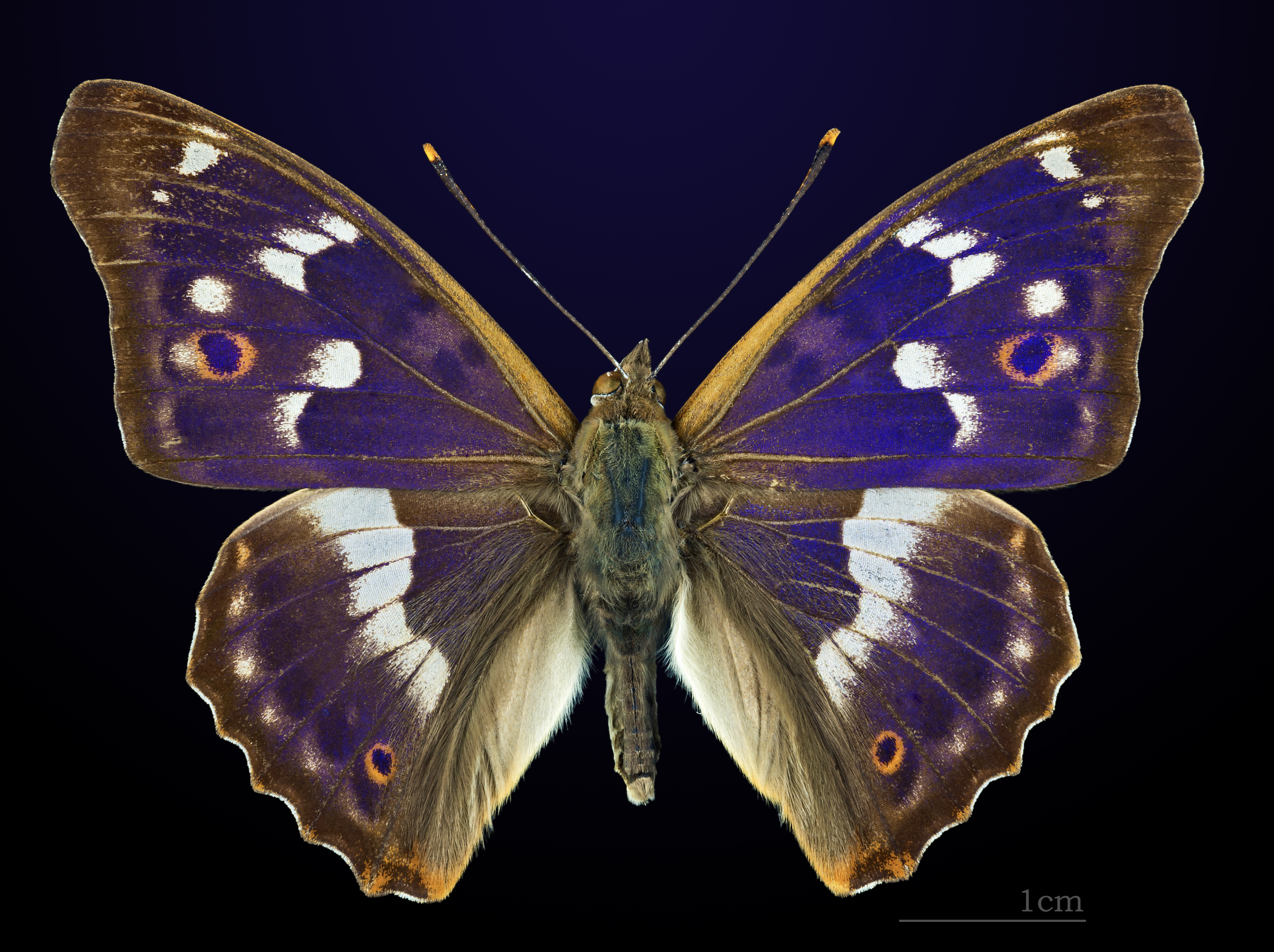
Apatura ilia ilia, male dorsal

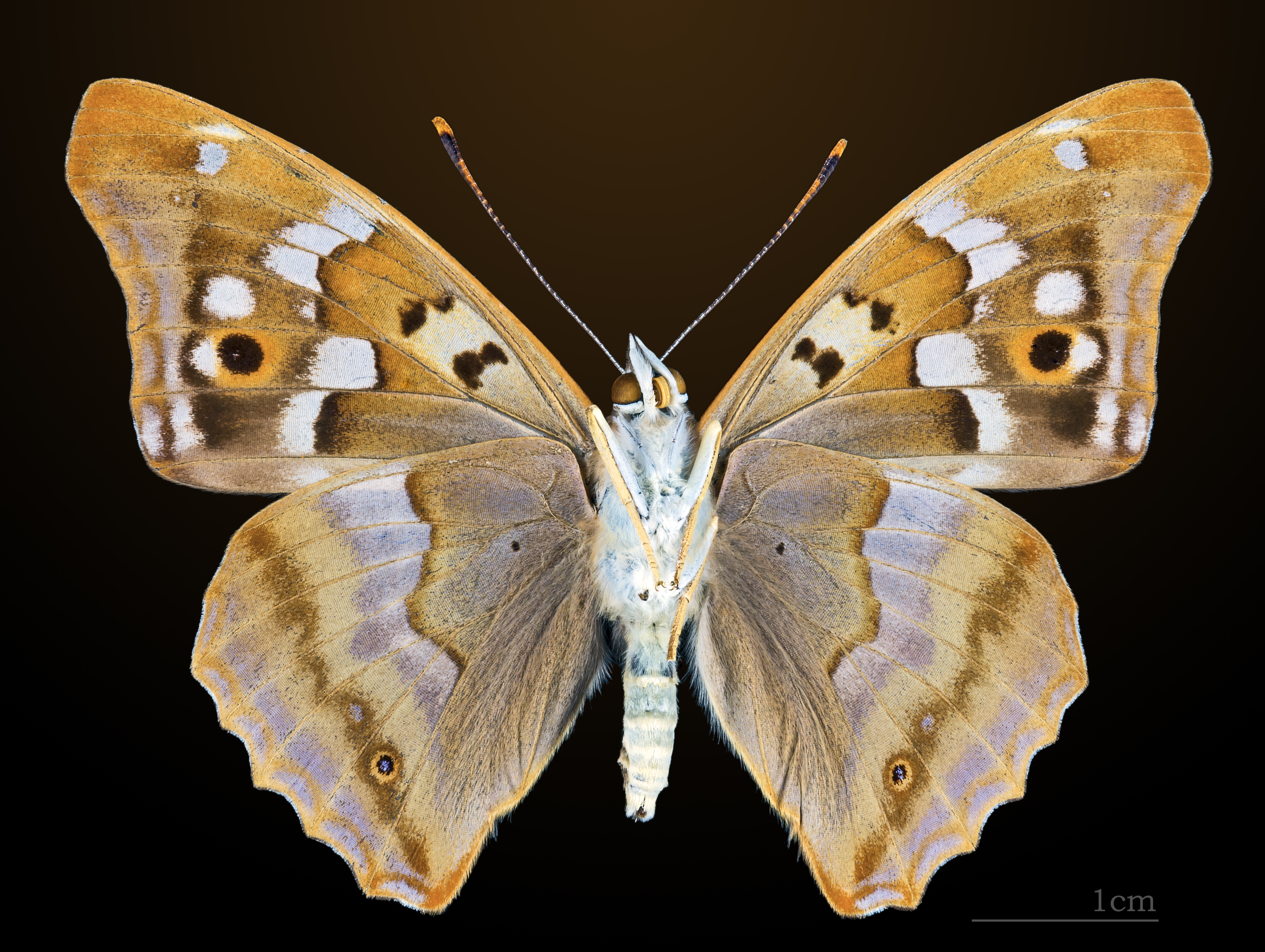
Apatura ilia ilia, male ventral

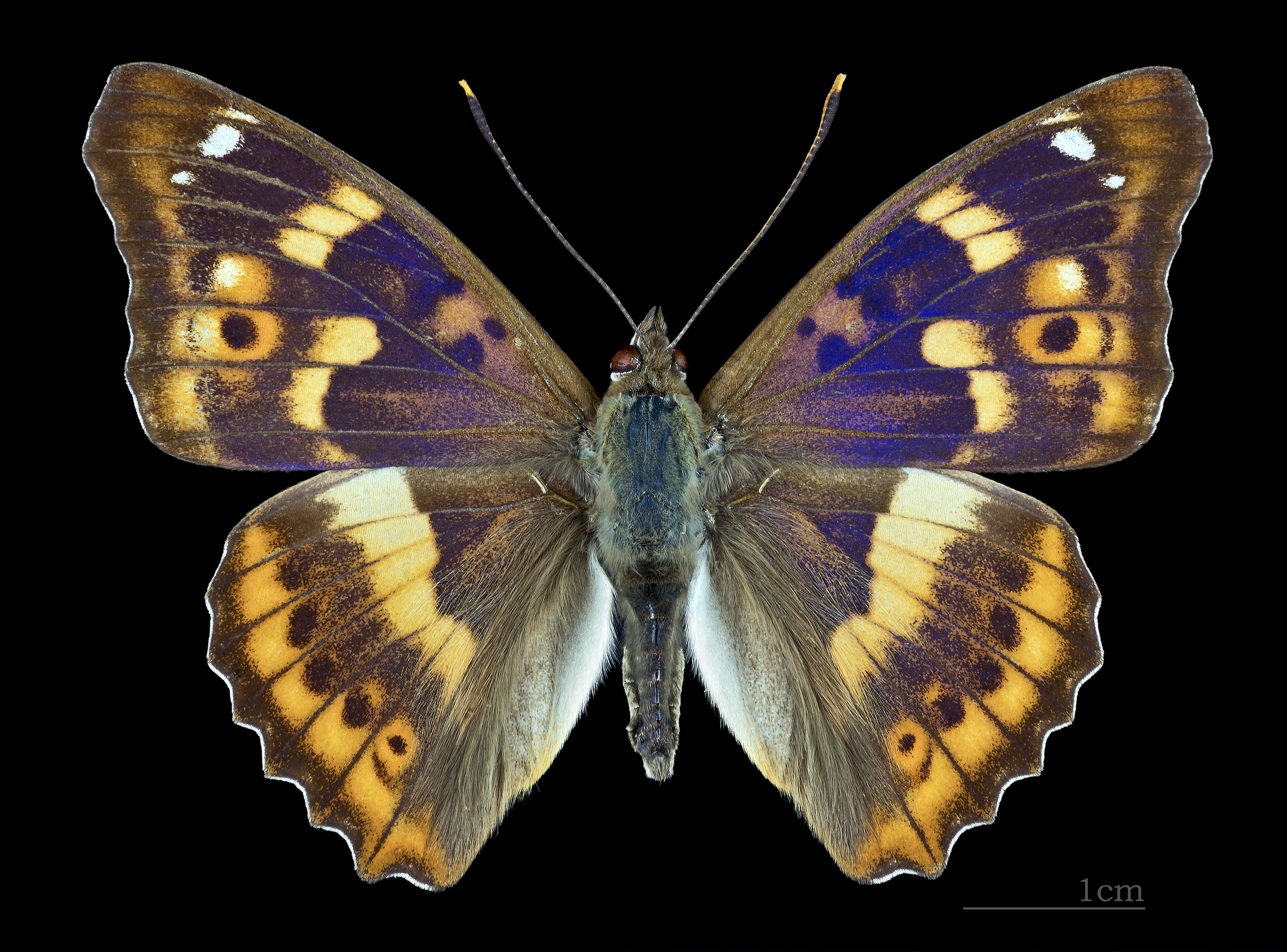
Apatura ilia ilia f. clytie, male dorsal

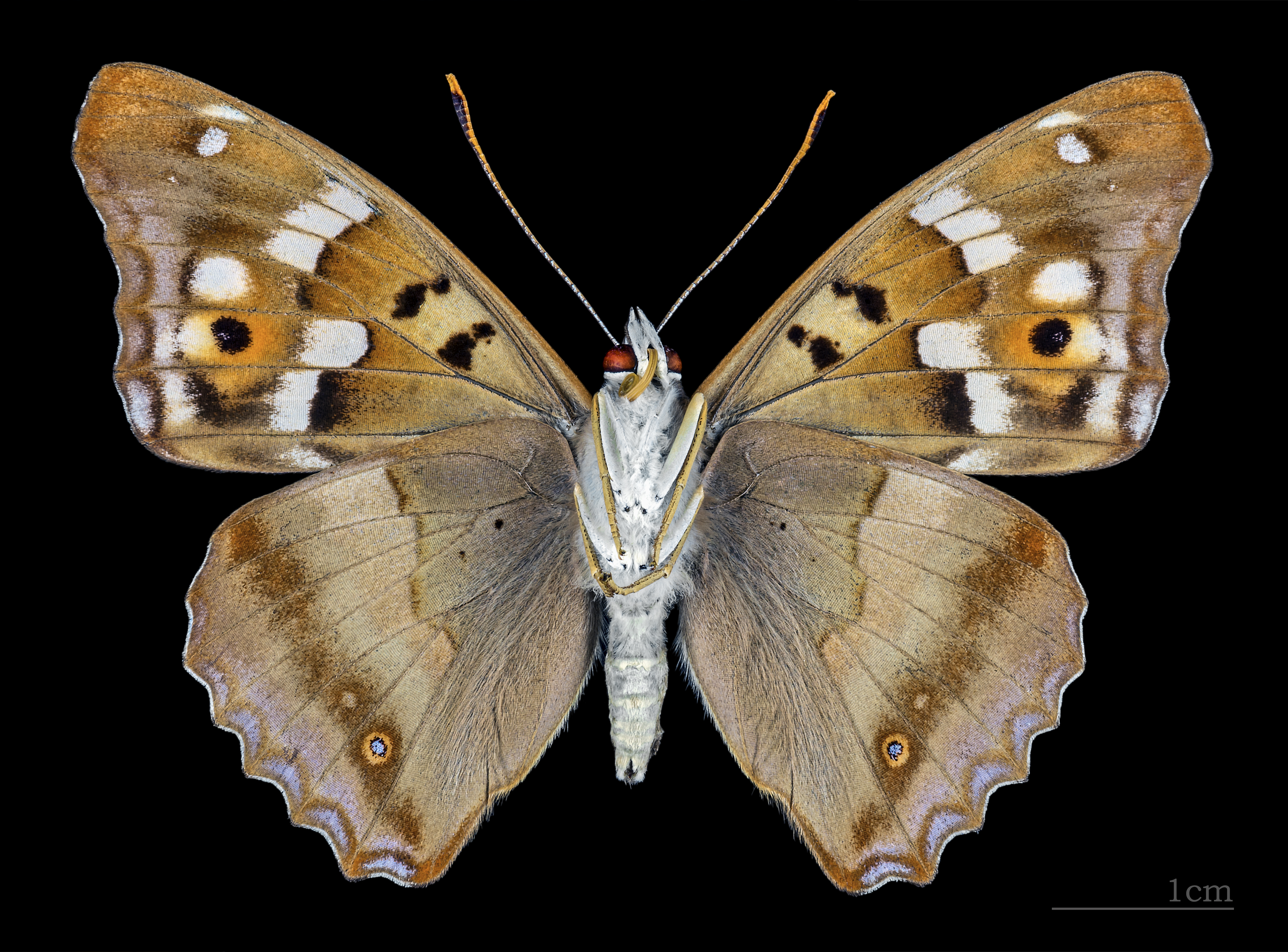
Apatura ilia ilia f. clytie, male ventral

== Description in Seitz ==
A. ilia Schiff. ( = Pap. iris Esp.) (50c) is characterized by the distal margin of the forewing being obtusely angulate below the apex; in the anal area of this wing there is an ocellus ringed with yellowish, and the median band of the hindwing has no tooth-like projection on the outer side; the male with violet gloss, the female dull black- brown or grey-brown, the bands and spots pure white in both sexes. Very variable in colour and pattern, the male as in the preceding species [Apatura iris] being sometimes shot with pure blue instead of violet. — A female form in which the markings are normally developed but have a yellowish tint, and in which (in contradistinction to dark specimens of clytie) the hindwing has no marginal spots, is female-ab. iliona Schultz [ab. iliona Schultz, 1904; Abh. Nat. Ges. Görlitz]; it corresponds to ab. lutescens of A. irisand occurs as a rarity among the ordinary form. — In ab. distincta Schultz [ab. distincta Schultz, 1904; Abh. Nat. Ges. Görlitz] the band of the hindwing is separated into isolated spots by broad vein streaks of the ground-colour. — ab. pallescens Schultz [ab.pallescens Schultz, 1904; Abh. Nat. Ges. Görlitz] is the name for paler coloured specimens of both sexes, with the ground-colour pale ashy-grey, the male being but feebly glossy; the underside of these not properly developed individuals is paler, having a yellowish tint; most specimens are, it seems, artificial products of temperature-experiments, but similar specimens are also now and again met with in the open. — ab. inspersa Schultz is characterized by the bands and spots of both wings being shaded with sooty-black, the markings, however, neither disappearing nor becoming diffuse. — ab. iliades Mitis [ab. iliades Mitis, 1899; Jber. Wien. Ent. Ver.] is black without any markings, at the most bearing the white subapical spots on the forewing, the male being shot with blue; it occurs everywhere among the main-form, the extreme as well as all intergradations, mostly in the male, more rarely in the female. — Sometimes there appear in otherwise normal specimens some yellowish spots in the anal angle of the forewing, a brownish macular band at the margin of the hindwing and between this band and the white median one some brownish smears; this form is ab. asta Schultz [ab. asta Schultz, 1904; Abh. Nat. Ges. Görlitz], which resembles to a certain extent bunea H.-Schaff [Apatura metis bunea (Herrich-Schäffer, 1845)]. — A broad yellow margin traversed by black veins distinguishes ab. magnifica Schultz [ ab. magnifica Schultz, 1904; Abh. Nat. Ges. Görlitz]. In the type of name (male) the other white markings are strongly sooty as in ab. inspersa [ab.inspersa Schultz, 1904; Abh. Nat. Ges. Görlitz]. A female form which belongs here has on a very dark ground the spots and median bands ivory-colour and the outer margin of the hindwing broadly brownish. Rare in nature, otherwise known as product of temperature-experiments. — ab. clytie [ ilia ssp. clytie [Denis & Schiffermüller], 1775] Schiff. (= iris Esp., julia Schrk., astasia Hbn.) (50c) is the form in which all the otherwise normal markings are brownish, except the subapical spots of the forewing, and in which the hindwing bears a brownish, entire or macular, submarginal band. Everywhere with the main form, the ground-colour varying from lighter to darker tints in transitions to the main form, there occurring single specimens which approach, or are even identical with, the brown local races dealt with below, and which, in the southern districts of the area, are locally prevalent or the only form, merging into those brown subspecies. — In ab. astasioides Stgr. [ ab. astasioides Staudinger, 1871; Cat. Lepid. eur. Faunegeb.] the brown bands and spots of the upperside are entirely, or almost, absent; this form takes the same position among clytie as ab. iliades among ilia. Here and there among the main form. — ab. phryne Aigner (50c) is a transition towards the previous; the markings in the central area of the forewing and a submarginal macular band on the hindwing as well as the median band are reddish brown and vestigial. Recorded from Hungary, also in other countries, together with clytie. — Larva of the species adult 4 – 5 cm, dirty green, similar to that of iris in shape and markings, but the reddish horns on the head with black stripe, the anterior part of the body with two red-edged yellow lines, the body from the centre backwards on each side with 5 red-margined yellow oblique stripes which extend over 2 segments, anal processes and legs blue-green. Its habits similar to those of A. iris; feeding especially on Populus tremida, P. pyramidalis, and on various willows, like Salix caprea, viminalis and rosmarinifolia. Pupa greenish, carinate dorsally; the back, the wing-cases and the processes of the head edged with yellow. The habits of the butterfly are similar to those of the preceding species[iris]; the nymo- typical subspecies with the individual forms mentioned above is distributed over Germany, Belgium, France, Switzerland, Austria, Bosnia, Serbia, western and northern Hungary, Finland, the Baltic Provinces of Russia, and South Russia (Volga districts). — As already mentioned, the white-marked form becomes less abundant already in certain southern districts of West and Central Europe, brown specimens appearing as the prevalent or only form, even representing special local races (see below). It is therefore a very remarkable fact that in Portugal flies a white-spotted race which differs but very slightly from the northern form, being characterised by the white spots situated at the eye-spot of the forewing being enlarged and the hindwing bearing, nearly as in ab. asta, a row of small brownish spots between the whitish submarginal spots and the median band. This race, apparently the most southern one, may be introduced as lusitanica subsp. nov.[A.ilia ssp. lusitanica Stichel, 1908] Porto, Portugal. — Of brown subspecies two have received names: eos Rossi (— heos Meigen, dilutior Stgr.) [ilia ssp. eos Rossi, 1794] (50d) and budensis Fuchs [ilia ssp. budensis Fuchs, 1899]. In the former the dark ground-colour is everywhere paler, being shaded and dusted with brown, especially at the base of the wings, the violet gloss is almost entirely absent, the ochre-yellow markings are dilated, being partly ill-defined, in the hindwing there is near the light submarginal band a row of roundish black-brown spots which shade off proximally. South France (Provence), Northern Italy. — The second race, budensis Fuchs, is similar, the blue gloss is entirely absent, the basal area of the hindwing is bright yellow; the dark border to the wings, usually present in clytie, is sometimes absent or is replaced by a heavy brown-grey arched stripe. Hungary, especially from Budapest south- and eastward, towards north less constant and characteristic, here in transitions towards clytie and in some places with a colouration approaching eos (Eperjes). Moreover, known from Bulgaria and the Bukovina, and sometimes considered identical with metis Freyer [ilia ssp. metis Frey, 1829 now full speciesApatura metis ], which is apparently erroneous. — The wings are still lighter in colour in here Fldr. (50e); the places of the wings which have remained dark are feebly shot with violet in the male, but the whole wing has a brilliant red-violet gloss when viewed at an acute angle; the median band of the hindwing is sometimes so much dilated towards the distal margin that it forms with the submarginal band a deep ochre-yellow area bearing a row of isolated rounded dark spots, from which radiate basad slight dark shadows. There occur, however, also indi viduals, especially among the females, in which the middle band is separated from the submarginal one by a grey- brown area, the submarginal band in this case being very broad and quite continuous. On the other hand, there is a female-form with whitish bands and spots which has the ground of the wings light ochreous and but here and there feebly shaded with blackish, the dark spots of the hindwing being reduced in size, roundish and entirely isolated. This conspicuous form may be introduced as female-ab. sobrina form. nov. (50e) [Apatura here ssp. sobrina Wileman, 1915 = A. i. here C. & R. Felder, 1862]. Eastern Central and North China (by Felder also recorded from Japan, apparently erroneously). There occur, with the yellow main form as well as in West China and in apparently identical specimens also in the Shan-States and Upper Burma (Bingham), individuals of a darker tint with the band whitish or (forewing) partly white, approaching serarum Oberth. A. ilia ssp. serarum Oberthür, 1891 (male = phaedra Leech) (50d). In this subspecies the ground-colour is dark, shot with deep blue in male, the markings white, the bands broadened, straight in the hindwing, sharply defined on both sides the hindwing bearing a row of small whitish submarginal spots; the ground-colour of the female is paler, without gloss. West China (Ta-tsien-lu, Omei-shan, etc.) and Central China (Chang-yang), also Yunnan. — Another line of development is represented by a form in which the eye-spots in the anal area of the hind- and also the forewing disappear and the band of the hindwing, though remaining of the same width as before, is more sharply defined. This form, which is found in the most southern districts of Russia, is metis Frr.[ full species or subspecies of ilia] (55e female). It is somewhat smaller than typical specimens of the species, and has the wings more sharply angulate, all the markings being ochreous as in clytie and more or less extended; the ocellus-like spot is sometimes altogether wanting in the hindwing, being usually reduced to a dot in the forewing. The female paler, with a more or less abundant yellow dusting. — With this main-form (so called on account of its being the first-described) occurs another in which only the sub marginal band of the hindwing and certain spots in the outer area of the forewing are golden yellow, the markings of the central area remaining white. This is ab. bunea H.-Schiff. (55d) [A. ilia ssp. bunea Herrich-Schäffer, 1844/4]and appears to be found only among the males — There occur thirdly specimens of both sexes which correspond to the main-form of ilia, having white markings and bearing at the margin of the hindwing only a row of obsolescent whitish spots. We name this form gertraudis form. nov. (55d) [ either full species Apatura gertraudis Stichel, 1908 (Lepindex) or form of ssp. bunea]. It is easily distinguished from ilia by the band of the hindwing being of even width and sharply defined and by the anal ocelli being reduced; the ground-colour of the female of this form is more or less dark, sometimes almost ashy grey, the markings being diffuse. — Lastly, with the name coelestina Gr.- Grsh.[ A. ilia ssp. metis Frey, 1829= Apatura metis are to designated such males of the main-form (metis) which have on the upperside a stronger, delicately sky-blue not violet, gloss. In this form the light marginal band of the hindwing is broadened and extends to the spots, with which is united. South-East Russia (Sarepta), Caucasus, and the Altai. — In Japan the species is represented by substituta Btlr. [ metis ssp. substituta Butler, 1873] (50d), which is very similar to metis (and therefore often confounded with it) The ground-colour of this form is generally darker, the eye-like spots of both wings are not obsolescent, the sub- marginal spots of the hindwing elongate-ovate or rounded-quadrate, instead of arrowhead-shaped or luniform as in metis, and on the underside the band of the hindwing is more distinctly white, contrasting with the ground. Some specimens (from Corea) have the bands of the upperside whitish and therefore recall bunea. Pryer says of this race that the butterflies love to circle around the tops of tall willows, on which feed the larvae, and that they now and again come down to damp places on the road or are resting on the leaves of their chosen tree. The green pupa is not dissimilar in shape and colour to a young willow-leaf. The butterfly, which varies in the depth of the colour, is more abundant in the mountains than in the plains. Tokio, on the Asamayama and Oyama, in Hokaido; according to Leech also in Nortii China and Corea, and according to Staudinger and Heyne on the Amur, Askold, in Suifun and Su-chan.

== Biology ==
A. ilia flies from May to September in one or two generations. It feeds on tree honeydew and flies near their summit. It goes down only to find moisture, honeydew shrubs or excrement. The eggs are laid singly on leaves. The caterpillar host plants are willows and poplars, in particular Populus tremula and Populus nigra. A. ilia either pupates in the same year or winters as a young caterpillar, becoming brown, stuck to a twig. The greyish green chrysalis hangs from a leaf or twig.

== Ecology and distribution ==
It is present in most of Europe and across the Palearctic to Japan. However, it is absent from the European Mediterranean islands and the southernmost regions, from the majority of Spain and Portugal, southern Italy and Greece, as well as Nordic countries (Denmark, Sweden, Norway), Poland, northern Germany and the British Isles.

This species belongs to a group of 35 European butterflies for which ecologists had sufficient data to assess the possible movements of their range in Europe. Of these 35 butterflies studied, Apatura ilia was an exception - it is the only species that has seen the northern limits of its area move slightly down to the south while its southern limit remained stable.

== Cultural references ==
- It is named in the Classical tradition, Ilia was the mother of Romulus and Remus in Roman mythology.
- In March 1987 DPR Korea issued a postage stamp depicting Apatura ilia.
