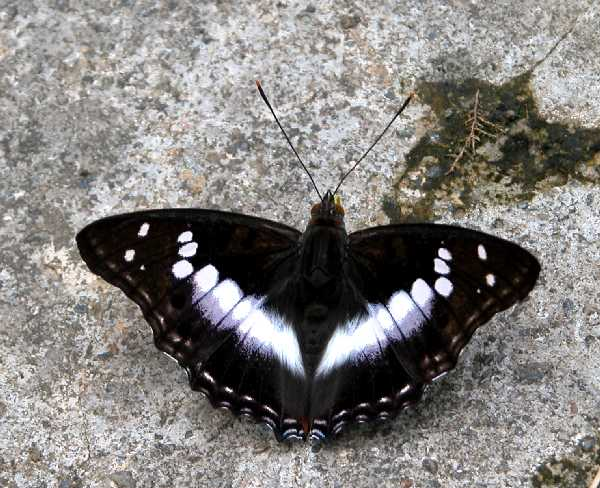
- Mimathyma ambica

Scientific classification
- Kingdom: Animalia
- Phylum: Arthropoda
- Clade: Pancrustacea
- Class: Insecta
- Order: Lepidoptera
- Family: Nymphalidae
- Subfamily: Apaturinae
- Genus: Mimathyma; Moore, [1896]

Synonyms
- Apatura; Bremeria Moore, [1896]; Athymodes Moore, [1896]; Amuriana Korshunov & Dubatolov, 1984

= Mimathyma =

Genus of brush-footed butterflies

Mimathyma is a genus of butterflies in the family Nymphalidae found in eastern and southern Asia. The genus was erected by Frederic Moore in 1896.

== Species ==
Listed alphabetically:

- Mimathyma ambica (Kollar, [1844]) – Indian purple emperor
- Mimathyma chevana (Moore, [1865]) – sergeant emperor
- Mimathyma nycteis (Ménétriès, 1859) (Amurland, Korea, northeast China)
- Mimathyma schrenckii (Ménétriès, 1858) – Schrenck's emperor (Amurland, Korea, northeast China)
