= Empress (disambiguation) =

An empress is a female ruler of an empire.

Empress or The Empress may also refer to:

== People ==
- Empress regnant, a female ruler of an empire in her own right
- Empress consort, the wife of a reigning emperor
  - Empress dowager, a widowed empress consort
    - Empress mother, an empress dowager who is also the mother of a reigning monarch
  - Empress of Japan, the wife of the Emperor of Japan
    - Empress Masako (born 1963), consort of Naruhito, Emperor of Japan

== Arts and entertainment ==
=== Games ===
- Empress (chess), an unorthodox chess piece that moves like a rook or a knight
- The Empress (Tarot card), a trump card

=== Literature ===
- Empress (comic book), a limited series written by Mark Millar
- Empress (character), a superheroine in the DC Comics universe
- Empress (novel), by Shan Sa, 2006
- Empress of Blandings, a fictional pig in the literature of P. G. Wodehouse also called the Empress
- Empress of Mijak, a novel by Karen Miller known as Empress in North America and the United Kingdom, 2007

=== Music ===
- Empress (album), by Yemi Alade, 2020

=== Film, plays and TV ===
- The Empress, a character in the Adventure Time miniseries Stakes
- The Empress, a fictional pirate ship in the film Pirates of the Caribbean: At World's End
- The Empress (play), by Tanika Gupta, 2013
- The Empress (TV series), a German historical drama, 2022

== Places ==
- Empress, Alberta, Canada
- Empress (provincial electoral district), Alberta, Canada
- Empress, Georgia, United States
- The Empress (hotel), Victoria, British Columbia, Canada

== Science and technology ==
- Empress (Sasakia funebris), a butterfly in the Sasakia genus
- Empress (cracker), a video game cracker
- EMPReSS, a database of standardized phenotyping protocols used by the International Mouse Phenotyping Consortium
- Empress Antonia (Asterocampa celtis antonia), a subspecies of Asterocampa celtis butterflies
- Empress Embedded Database, a commercial relational database software also called Empress
- Empress Flora (Asterocampa clyton flora), a subspecies of Asterocampa clyton butterflies
- Empress Louisa (A. c. louisa), a subspecies of Asterocampa clyton butterflies

== Ships ==
- HMS Empress, various British Royal Navy ships
- MS Empress, a cruise ship launched in 1989
- USS Empress (SP-569), a United States Navy passenger barge in service during 1917

== Other uses ==
- Canadian Pacific 2816, a train also called "Empress"
- Empress, a retired call sign for Canadian North
- Empress, the current call sign for Canadian Pacific Air Lines

== See also ==
- American Empress, a cruise ship launched in 2003
- Beatmania IIDX 16: Empress, the 16th game in the Beatmania IIDX music video games series, 2008
- Emperor (disambiguation)
- Empress brilliant (Heliodoxa imperatrix), a species of hummingbird
- Empress cicada (Megapomponia imperatoria), a species of cicada from Southeast Asia
- Empress Leilia (Asterocampa leilia), a species of butterfly found in the United States and Mexico
- Empress of Australia, various ships
- Empress Springs, Western Australia, Australia
- Empress Theatre (disambiguation)
- Empress tree (Paulownia tomentosa), a deciduous tree native to China and the Korean Peninsula
- La Emperatriz, an album by Rigoberta Bandini, 2022
- Painted empress (Apaturopsis cleochares), a species of butterfly found in Africa
- RMS Empress of Asia, a British ocean liner launched in 1912 and sunk in 1942
- RMS Empress of Britain, various ocean liners
- RMS Empress of Canada, various ships
- RMS Empress of China, various ocean liners
- RMS Empress of Ireland, a British ocean liner launched in 1906 and sunk in 1914
- The Emperor (disambiguation)
