= Joseph Salter (missionary) =

English Christian missionary (1822–1899)

- Born: 9 April 1822; Middlesex, England
- Died: 3 March 1899 (aged 76); London, England
- Occupation: Missionary
- Known for: Work at the Strangers' Home & Ayahs' Home
- Spouse: Eliza Salter
- Children: 5

Joseph Salter (9 April 1822 – 3 March 1899) was a Christian missionary in London who worked with migrants to the United Kingdom in the nineteenth century. He was particularly known for his work with lascars and later for his work with ayahs. He taught himself several Indian languages and wrote two books describing his work.

== Early life and family ==
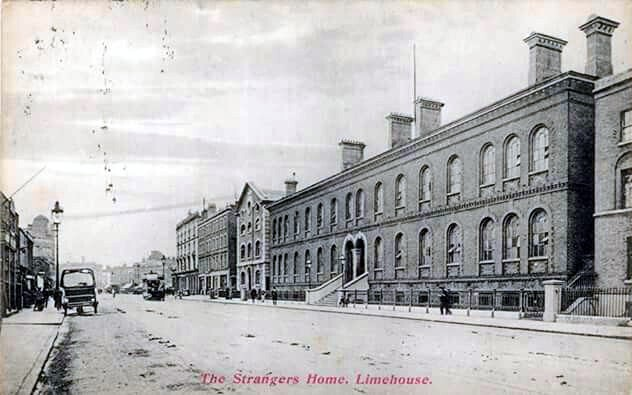
The Strangers' Home, Limehouse

Joseph Salter was born at St Luke's, London, England, on 9 April 1822 to Matthew and Harriett Salter. He married Eliza Elizabeth Boid in 1853 who was born in Shoreditch, London. At the time of the 1861 census, the couple were living at Conant Place, Stepney, but had no children. At the time of the 1881 and 1891 censuses the family was living at East India Dock Road, not far from the Strangers' Home in West India Dock Road where Salter worked. They had children Elizabeth, Agnes, Joseph, Emily, and Alice.

== Missionary activity ==
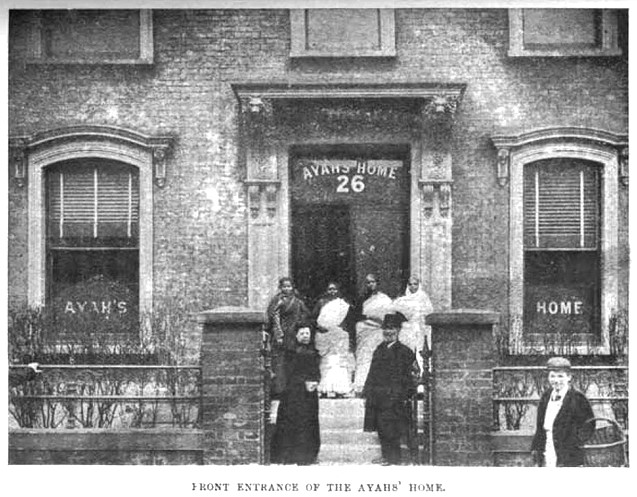
Ayahs' Home, 26 King Edward Road, Hackney, c. 1900

Salter was the missionary at the Strangers' Home for Asiatics, Africans and South Sea Islanders (opened 1857), Limehouse, on behalf of London City Mission where he gained experience of working with lascars and taught himself several Indian languages. The home was established to deal with the problem of stranded lascars in London who by law were unable to obtain employment to return to their home countries.

In 1867, Salter found small groups of stranded Asians all over Britain. He worried about the effect of the "heathen mind" being exposed to European sin as well as the sin of its homeland and attempted to convert those he met to Christianity. Still, his efforts were generally received only with polite indifference.

In December 1886, the Home had declared its intention to evict five Punjabi performers and their bear. They had initially arrived in England in the hope of making an income at fairs. However, their plans had not worked out and they soon found that they could not pay their rent. Salter described them as in a "perilous" situation and after confirming the sale of the bear to the Zoological gardens, appealed to the India Office for help but received a clear refusal of responsibility.

Salter was later associated with the Ayahs' Home in Hackney. Once, returning after helping an ayah board her ship to return home, he fell in the water and almost drowned.

== Writing ==
Salter wrote two memoirs about his experiences. In the first, which he dedicated to Maharaja Duleep Singh, The Asiatic in England: Sketches of Sixteen Years' Works Among Orientals (1873), he described the tortures received by lascars on sea voyages, and his disbelief that anyone could think that "the coloured part of mankind existed only to be used like brute beasts, and to have the most insulting names language can supply heaped upon them". His second, The East in the West; or, Work among the Asiatics and Africans in London was published by Partridge in 1895.

== Death and legacy ==
Salter died on 3 March 1899. His residence at the time of his death was 377 East India Dock Road. Probate was granted in London to Emily Marion Gilley and her husband Samuel Gilley, inspector to a friendly society, in the amount of £1,853.

== Selected publications ==
- The Asiatic in England: Sketches of Sixteen Years' Works Among Orientals. Seeley, Jackson, and Halliday, London, 1873.
- The East in the West; or, Work among the Asiatics and Africans in London. S.W. Partridge & Co., London, 1895.
