= Emperor (disambiguation) =

An emperor is a type of monarch.

Emperor may also refer to:

== Animals ==
- Emperor angelfish
- Emperor bream
- Emperor penguin
- Emperor moths, moths of the subfamily Saturniinae
  - in particular the type genus Saturnia
- Emperor scorpion
- a number of brush-footed butterflies:
  - in the subfamily Apaturinae:
    - Emperors, the genus Apatura
    - American emperors, the genus Asterocampa
    - a few species in various sister genera of the above:
      - Golden emperor, Dilipa morgiana
      - Indian purple emperor, Mimathyma ambica
      - Sergeant emperor, Mimathyma chevana
      - Sordid emperor, two different species:
        - Asterocampa idyja, native to North America
        - Chitoria sordida, native to Southeast Asia
      - Tawny emperor, two different species:
        - Asterocampa clyton from North America
        - Chitoria ulupi from East Asia
      - Tytler's emperor, Eulaceura manipuriensis
      - White emperor, Helcyra hemina
      - The emperor, Morpho peleides
  - in the subfamily Charaxinae:
    - some of the butterflies in the genus Charaxes

== Media and entertainment ==
- Emperor (2012 film), a historical drama film directed by Peter Webber
- Emperor (2020 film), a historical drama film directed by Mark Amin
- The Emperor (film), a 1967 short documentary film by George Lucas
- Emperor Entertainment Group of Emperor Group
- Emperor, a novel in the science fiction Isaac Asimov's Robots in Time series by William F. Wu
- Emperor (novel series), a book series by Conn Iggulden
- Emperor (Baxter novel), a novel by Stephen Baxter
- Hol Horse's Stand from JoJo's Bizarre Adventure
- Emperor Palpatine, the main antagonist of the Star Wars franchise

=== Music ===
- Emperor Concerto, Beethoven's fifth piano concerto
- Quartet No. 62 in C Major ("Emperor"), Op. 76, No. 3, FHE No. 42, Hoboken No. III:77, a string quartet by Joseph Haydn
- Emperor (Norwegian band), a Norwegian black metal band
  - Emperor (EP), 1993 EP by Emperor
- Emperor (Burmese band), a Burmese hard rock and metal band
- The Emperors, an American soul band

=== Games ===
- Emperor: Battle for Dune, a sci-fi computer game
- Emperor: Rise of the Middle Kingdom, a city-builder computer game
- Emperor of Mankind, a character in the Warhammer 40,000 universe

== Transportation ==
- HMY Emperor (1856), was a steam yacht presented to the "Emperor of Japan" by Queen Victoria, renamed Banryū by Japan
- Emperor, two locomotives in the GWR Iron Duke Class
- Emperor, a locomotive in the South Devon Railway Buffalo class
- Emperor, one of the GWR 3031 Class locomotives that were built for and run on the Great Western Railway between 1891 and 1915
- HMS Emperor (D98), was an Ameer-class escort carrier, transferred to the Royal Navy under lend-lease in 1943 and returned to the US Navy in 1946

== Other uses ==
- Emperor (grape), an Australian wine grape
- Emperor (roller coaster), a roller coaster in Sea World San Diego
- The Emperor (Tarot card), a tarot card
- Emperor (typeface), a type face cut by Baltimore Type Foundry
- "Emperor", a disc golf distance driver by Infinite Discs
- Rome Emperors, minor league baseball team in Rome, Georgia

== See also ==
- Category:Emperors
- Empire (disambiguation)
- Empress (disambiguation)
- The Emperor (disambiguation)
