= Ayahs' Home =

Home for Indian and Chinese nannies in London

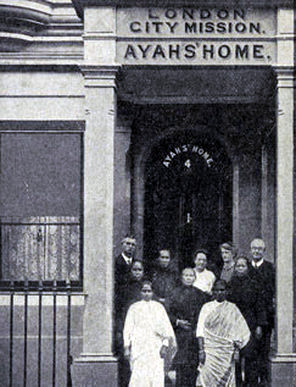
- Purpose: Home for abandoned or destitute ayahs
- Location: 4 King Edward Road, Hackney, London
- Affiliations: London City Mission

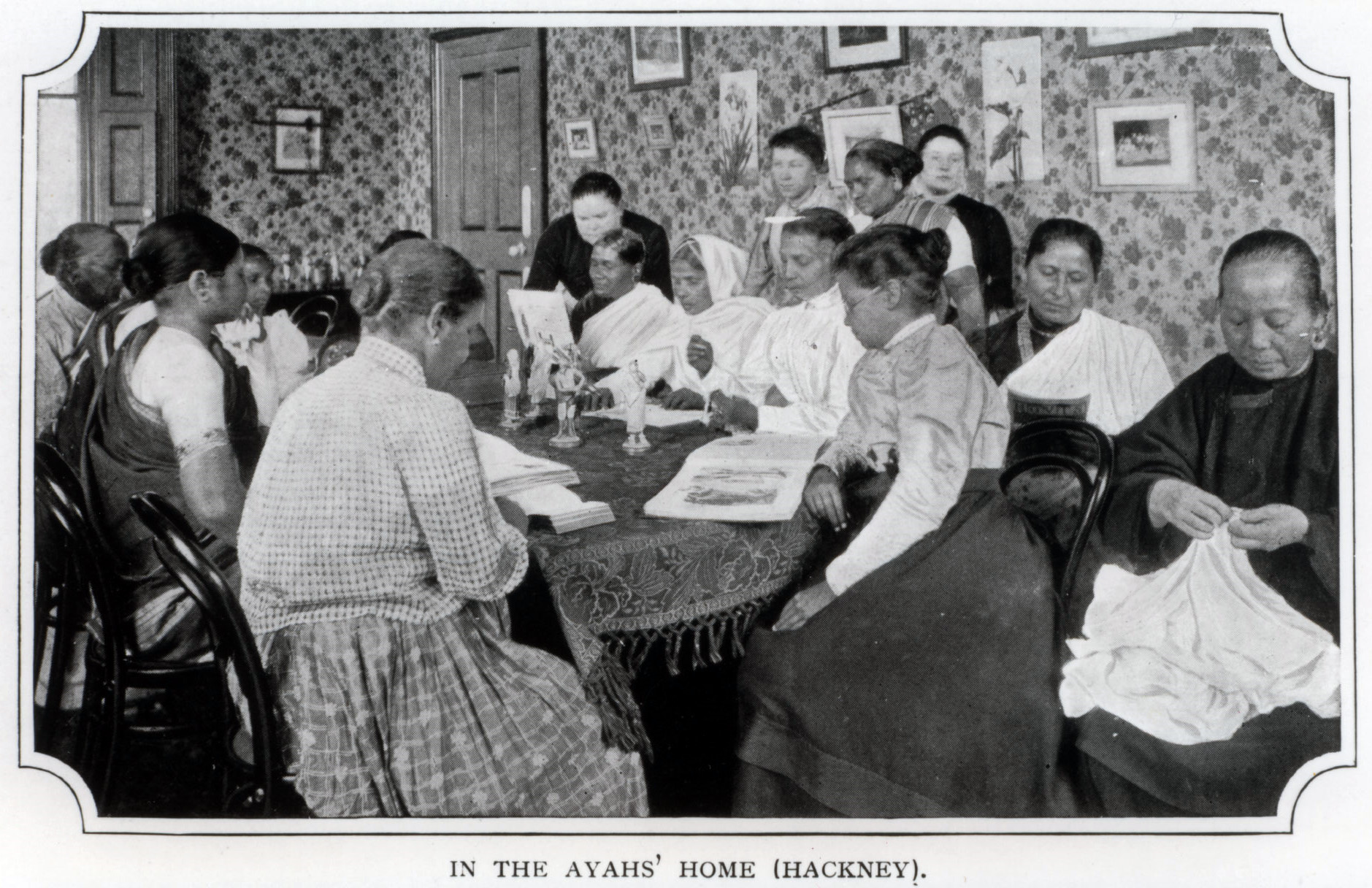
"In the Ayahs' Home (Hackney)" from George R. Sims's Living London (1901)

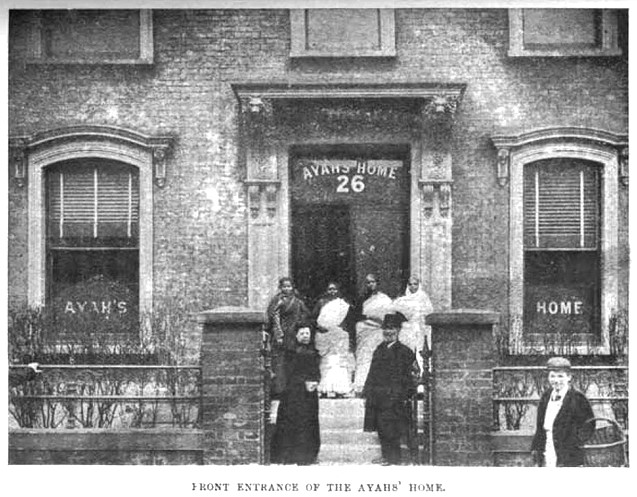
Ayahs' Home, 26 King Edward Road, Hackney, c. 1900

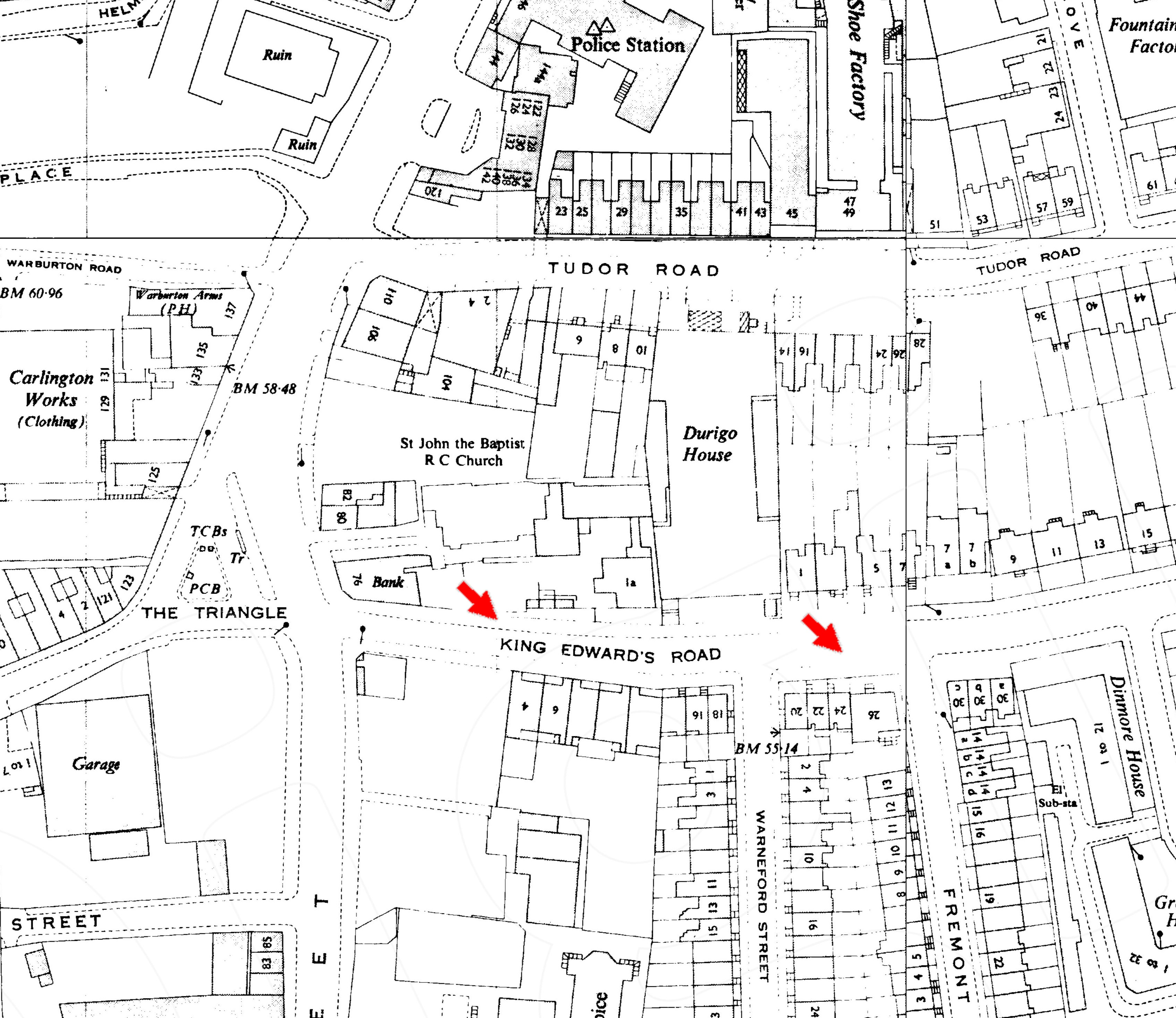
Former locations of the Ayahs' Home (arrowed) at King Edward's Road, Hackney, on a 1948 map

The Ayahs' Home in London provided accommodation for Indian ayahs and Chinese amahs (nannies) at the turn of the 20th century who were "ill-treated, dismissed from service or simply abandoned" with no return passage to their home country. The Home also operated like an employment exchange to help ayahs find placements with families returning to British India. It was the only institution of its type in Britain with a named building.

== Background ==
Following the Indian Rebellion of 1857, the East India Company was abolished and its powers transferred to the British Crown under the Government of India Act 1858. This resulted in a large number of British families travelling between the two countries. Many of these families employed local servants as they were cheaper than British staff. Among them were ayahs, the most highly prized being the sophisticated "Madrassi ayahs". Some ayahs were experienced travellers and advertised their services in newspapers. Travelling ayahs were seen as "honest, clean, capable nurses and made good sailors".

The British public were captivated by the picturesque ayahs shown in paintings and books. The ayah would accompany the British family back to England, either on the seasonal trips to escape the Indian summer or on retirement of the colonial official. These journeys were more frequent from the 1870s with the introduction of steam-powered ships and regular passenger services such as those provided by P&O. The journey was shortened by 4,500 miles after the Suez Canal opened in 1869, with the effect that up to 140 travelling ayahs visited England every year with their employing families, memsahibs (a term for ladies of the family) and children. Some may have had a sense of adventure, but they were vulnerable to the whims of their erstwhile employers. Without official contracts or guarantees for return passages, some ayahs then had their employment terminated or were abandoned, forcing them to live in squalor or to beg. Others found alternative employment to pay for return journeys or stayed in Britain.

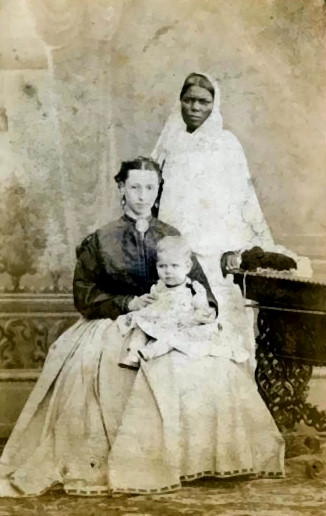
A ''memsahib'' sitting with her baby on her lap, with the ayah standing behind, 1860s

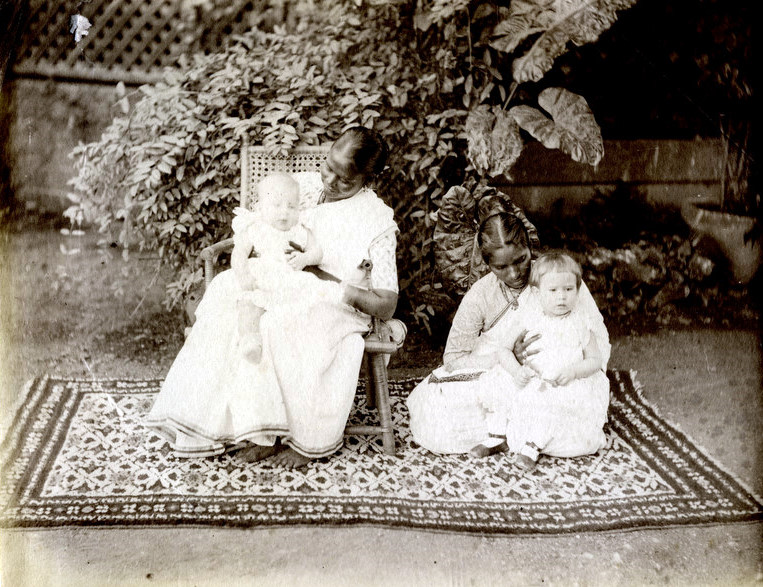
Ayahs with their charges, 1880s

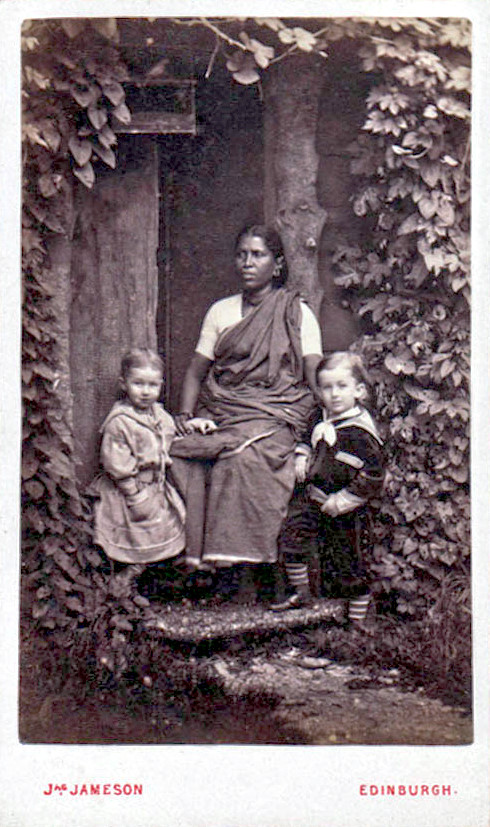
Ayah with children

== Origins ==
The exact date and method of establishment of the Ayahs' Home is unclear. Evidence from the India Office gives a foundation date of 1825; however, it has also been said to have been founded in 1891 by a Mr and Mrs Rogers at 6 Jewry Street, Aldgate. It appears to have been closed prior to 1891 due to administrative inadequacies, but, in response to the lobbying of a committee of white British women, the foreigners' branch committee of the London City Mission (LCM) took it over and prevented its permanent closure. Around 1900, the Home moved to 26 King Edward Road, Hackney, and in 1921, requiring more space, it moved to the larger 4 King Edward Road. The new home was opened by Lady Chelmsford, wife of Frederic Thesiger, 1st Viscount Chelmsford, the former Viceroy of India and ran until 1943 when the address is recorded as the East London Tabernacle Hostel.

== Early years ==
Regarded as a "symbol of empire" and a "home from home", around 100 ayahs stayed at the Home each year. The residents were mainly nursemaids from India and other countries including China, Java and Malaya. Socio-political changes created variations in numbers, with a higher occupancy during the summer when many British families left India to escape the heat. The home was almost unoccupied from November to March. It was busier during the First World War when sea travel was banned for women, with a resulting increase in the number of stranded ayahs. After the Armistice of 11 November 1918, 223 Ayahs were recorded at the Home as families rushed back to England at the first opportunity. The number of occupants was less during the depression of the 1930s. The length of stay varied from weeks to months.

Despite the lack of any testimonies from the ayahs, it is known that they were typically older women, used to childcare responsibilities and able to fit into both the English and Indian worlds. Life in the Home was an amalgamation of oriental and western tradition, with Indian food, the playing of pachis (a board game), embroidery and outings to places of interest such as Westminster Abbey, the Houses of Parliament and Buckingham Palace. The home was decorated in an "oriental fashion". Food was provided for different tastes and presumably religious requirements.

The Home generated income by the resale of the ayah's ticket, public donations, fundraising events and the sale of handwork done by the ayahs. A deficit in finances by 1917, when the war prolonged occupancy, led the Home's administrator to apply to the India Office for assistance. Initially hesitant, by 1928 the government was making an annual contribution to the Home.

== Matron's testimony ==
In 1910, Mrs Dunn, the matron of the Home, gave evidence to the Committee on Distressed Colonial and Indian Subjects of the India Office. Dunn described how the system depended on the ayah's return ticket. The employer who released the ayah from duties once in Britain typically purchased the ayah's return ticket, which was transferred to the Home. The ticket was then "sold" to a family wanting the ayah's services; the Home used the money from the sale to pay for the ayah's accommodation until she departed. According to her evidence, the Home had been established by a committee of women who had realised there should be a shelter for abandoned ayahs in England.

Among the evidence that was given by Mrs Dunn and also recorded in correspondence between the Home and the India Office was of an ayah who was brought to England from Bombay by a British woman in 1908, who, in the usual manner, released her to Thomas Cook and Son in order to transfer her employment. Re-employed by the Drummond family of Edinburgh who had pledged her return to India, she was abandoned at London's King's Cross Station, leaving her with one pound after two weeks' work. The ayah arrived at the Thomas Cook office, which then directed her to the Home. Not in the custom of taking in destitute women, Mrs Dunn successfully obtained compensation from the India Office.

== Residents ==
In 1900 the Ayahs' Home was housing between 90 and 100 women each year. The residents were separated by nationality and caste in the dormitories but mixed during the day.

In the 1911 census, there were five boarders listed, including amah Ah Kum, (born in Hong Kong), ayah Elsie Hamey (born in Ceylon) and ayahs Mary Stella, Pikya Sawmey and Mary Fernandez from India. Mary Fernandez – the name suggesting a Luso-Indian or Anglo-Indian origin – is thought to have been a regular travelling ayah and one of the 331 victims of the sinking of the SS Persia by the German U-boat U-38 in 1915, as her last address was Ayah's House, 26 King Edward Road, Hackney.

Antony Pereira made an alleged 54 journeys, and frequented the Ayah's Home.

== Missionary activity ==
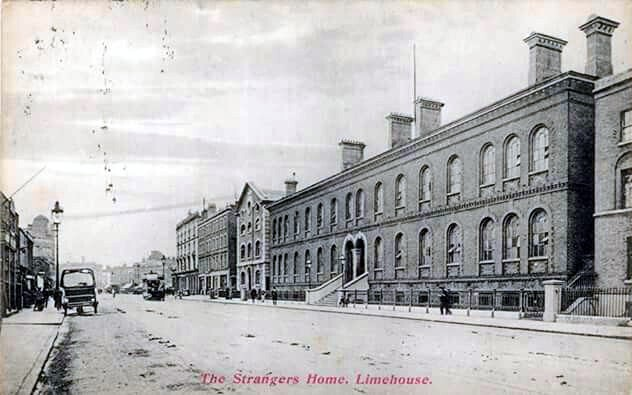
The Strangers' Home, Limehouse, where Joseph Salter also worked

The Home was a converting station for missionaries to introduce the ayahs to Christianity. "Foreigners' Fetes" were frequently organised by the Foreigner's Branch Committee of the London City Mission, which was supported by Christian missionaries. Religious services were held daily, hymns were taught and religious "chats in the bedroom" which the matron felt were "productive of much good", were part of daily life at the Home. This all principally stemmed from the perception of ayahs as "child-like".

Demonstrating a "domestic ideal and moral framework", the parlour of the Home was depicted in Alec Robert's Living London article "Missionary London", with a group of women looking busy sewing and reading. Expressing Christian charity for the benefit of the ayahs' welfare and the British empire, the Home encouraged the ayahs to show gratitude and loyalty.

Joseph Salter was the missionary responsible for the Home. London City Mission had previously employed him to work with lascars (foreign sailors) at the Strangers' Home for Asiatics in Limehouse near the London Docklands, and during this time he had developed his skills and his fluency in several Indian languages.

== Recognition and commemoration ==
Rozina Visram, historian of the Asian presence in Britain, in 1986 wrote Ayahs, Lascars and Princes: The Story of Indians in Britain 1700–1947.

The Swadhinata Trust, a secular Bengali group based on Brick Lane, produced a brief history of "Bengalis in London's East End" in 2010, which claimed that London Metropolitan University had a building on the site of the Ayah's Home.

In 2013, the Royal Shakespeare Company produced Tanika Gupta's play The Empress, about Queen Victoria, the equally real Abdul Karim, who became her teacher (munshi), and a fictional young ayah who was abandoned at Tilbury Docks by her employers. Gupta was inspired to write the play when her curiosity was piqued by a photograph from the Ayah's Home reproduced in the work of Rozina Vishram. The play was directed by Emma Rice of Kneehigh Theatre. The Birmingham Mail compared The Empress to a sequel to the 1997 film Mrs Brown, and The Telegraph's review predicted that it would be turned into a film, but when Victoria & Abdul appeared in 2017, it was based on the book of the same title by the Indian historian Shrabani Basu – no ayahs involved. In 2019 Pearson Edexcel added The Empress to its list of GCSE English literature texts, ensuring that the story of the ayahs and their Hackney home reaches schools across England.

From March to September 2016, the Geffrye Museum (now the Museum of the Home) held an exhibition "Swept Under the Carpet? Servants in London Households 1600-2000", which included a mention of the Ayah's Home.

In October 2016, Meera Syal drew attention to the Ayahs' Home in the Sky Arts programme Treasures of the British Library (series 1, episode 2). The writer and actress selected letters concerning the plight of one unnamed woman, stranded by the Drummond family as described above, and how she found her way to the Ayahs' Home. The British Library documented this, with photographs of the correspondence and of the building, in a post entitled "An abandoned ayah" in its Untold Lives blog. The ayahs featured in the 2018 BBC Two series A Passage to Britain, in which historian Yasmin Khan used ships' passenger records to trace the stories of migration from the Indian Subcontinent from the 1930s-1950s.

The 2018 programme led to The Ayahs' Home Project. Supported by the council's arts and culture representative and the local MP Rushanara Ali, the project aims to bring the history of ayahs to light. It launched on International Women's Day 2020 at Hackney Museum, with presentations from academics, including Rozina Visram, still "the acknowledged authority", according to The Guardian review of the event. The launch also included elements aimed at a younger audience, such as a poetry workshop and spoken word performance by The Yoniverse Collective, and a visual exhibition in partnership with the East End Women's Museum. The unfolding of the stories of the ayahs and the home has been covered by the BBC in Britain and the Business Standard in India.

A video installation entitled "Re-soundings Prelude- The Ayahs Home" was exhibited at Bikaner House in New Delhi in 2020. Also in that year, a children's novel was published; When Secrets Set Sail is set in modern times, in the building that used to be the Ayahs' home and is now re-imagined as a refugee hostel.

Scholarship on historical forms of domestic employment is now examining its international patterns, in which the Ayahs' Home plays a part. The Ayah and Amah International Research Network was founded by a Hackney Museum manager; several of its members are funded by the Australian Research Council to research 'Ayahs and Amahs: Transcolonial Servants in Australia and Britain, 1780 to 1945'.

Following lobbying from the Ayahs' Home Project, in June 2022 English Heritage unveiled a blue plaque on the building which had housed the Home from 1900 to 1921, at 26 King Edward Road, Hackney.
