= The Empress (play) =

2013 play by Tanika Gupta

- Written by: Tanika Gupta
- Subject: Colonialism, migration, identity, Queen Victoria and India
- Genre: Historical drama

Premiere
- Date: 2013
- Place: Stratford-upon-Avon

The Empress is a 2013 play by Tanika Gupta, commissioned by the Royal Shakespeare Company and premiered in Stratford upon Avon. It is now on the GCSE curriculum and appeared as an unseen drama extract in the 2014 Junior Certificate English examination.

== Plot ==
Ayah Rani Das and lascar sailor Hari fall in love as she travels from India to London with her employer's family in 1887. On the voyage she also meets Dadabhai Naoroji (coming to Britain to push for Indian independence or home rule), his assistant Gandhi and Abdul Karim (being sent to Britain as a gift to Queen Victoria for her Golden Jubilee). Rani is unexpectedly abandoned by the family at the dockside in London but finds allies, although she also runs away from Hari after mistaking his honourable intentions towards her. She is taken in by Lord John Oakham, who needs an ayah for his family and is fond of India, having grown up there. However, he forces her into a non-consensual affair and then sacks her when she falls pregnant with his child. She considers abandoning her child but is instead taken in by 'Lascar Sally', a white Londoner who runs a seamen's home, then by the Ayahs' Home. She next becomes secretary to Naoroji, who succeeds in becoming Britain's second Asian Member of Parliament in 1892.

In the meantime Abdul becomes closer and closer friends with Victoria, describing the Taj Mahal to her, teaching her Urdu and Persian, having his portrait painted and even contrasting British imperialist policy in South Africa with the earliest ten Islamic rules for warfare. Naoroji is disappointed in his hopes to pursue a progressive agenda in Parliament and decides to return to India, offering that Rani can come with him. Just before Naoroji leaves, Hari arrives at the MP's office to meet Rani and - though they are still pained by what has happened since they last met - the couple reconcile. As her Diamond Jubilee approaches Victoria is blackmailed by her court and family into not making Abdul a Companion of the Order of the Indian Empire as she had hoped, though she does have a dream or vision of him taking her to all the sights, smells and sounds of India, something she never achieved in reality. On her death, their papers and correspondence are destroyed by her envious and racist successor Edward VII and Abdul is sent back to the estate Victoria had given him in Agra.

== Reception ==
Writing in The Daily Telegraph, Dominic Cavendish praised The Empress “This fascinating new theatre production has got ‘make this into a movie’ written all over it.”
