= Colin O'Brien =

Colin O'Brien may refer to:

- Colin O'Brien (tennis)
- Colin O'Brien (photographer)
- Colin O'Brien (hurler)
- Colin O'Brien (actor)
