= Tawny emperor =

Tawny emperor is the common name of two species of brush-footed butterflies in the subfamily Apaturinae:

- Asterocampa clyton, native to North America
- Chitoria ulupi, native to East Asia
