= Empress Theatre =

Empress-Theater may refer to:

== Australia ==
- Empress Theatre (Victoria) in Prahran, Victoria, which was destroyed by fire in June 1971

== Canada ==
- Empress Theatre (Montreal) (also known as Cinema V) in Montreal, Quebec, Canada
- Empress Theatre (Vancouver), a 1908 theater at Gore and Hastings in Chinatown, Vancouver until demolished in 1940
- Empress Theatre (Fort Macleod), 1912 two-storey brick-theater in Fort Macleod, Alberta

== New Zealand ==
- Empress Theatre (Wellington), former theater in the Te Aro area of Wellington, replaced by the Majestic Cinema which was itself demolished in 1925

== United Kingdom ==
- Empress Theatre (Brixton) 1898 theater in Brixton designed by Wylson & Long built by W. H. Burney and W. J. Grimes
- Empress Theatre (Glasgow) one of the former names of The Metropole Theater in Glasgow's west end
- Empress Theatre (Partick), a 1900 theater in Partick designed by H & D Barclay
- Empress Theatre (Whitley Bay) an 1800-seater theater at Spanish City, Whitley Bay
- The 2 storey, 6000 seater theater at the Empire of India Exhibition

== United States ==
- Empress Theatre (California) in Vallejo, California, United States
- Empress Theatre (Magna, Utah) a 1916 neo-classical theater
- Former name of the Crest Theatre in Sacramento, California
- Former Empress Theatre (Cincinnati) in Ohio; the first known Cincinnati chili establishment was founded to serve their patrons
