= East End Women's Museum =

Coordinates: 51°32′01.6″N 0°04′31.2″E

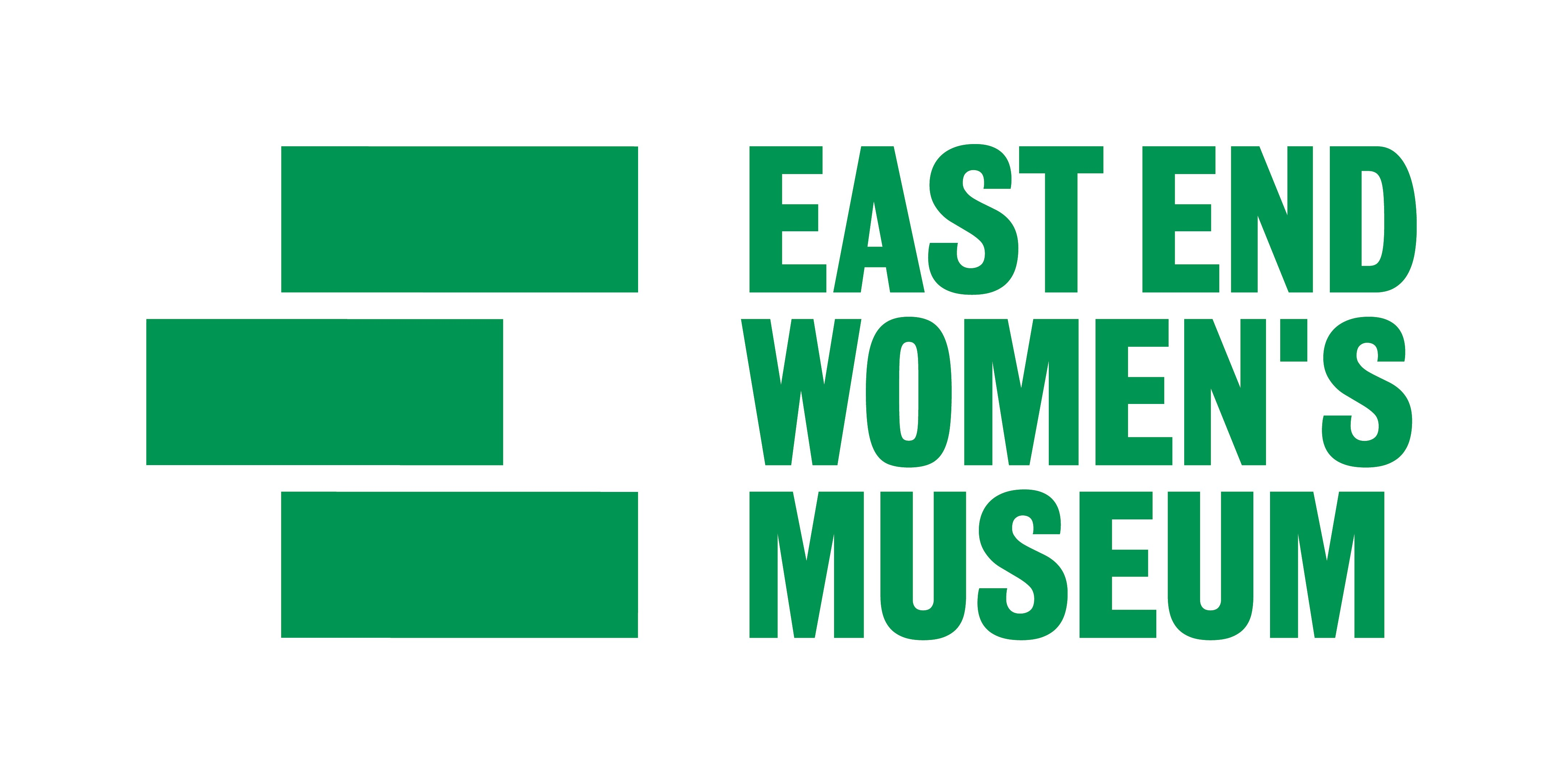
- Logo introduced in 2015

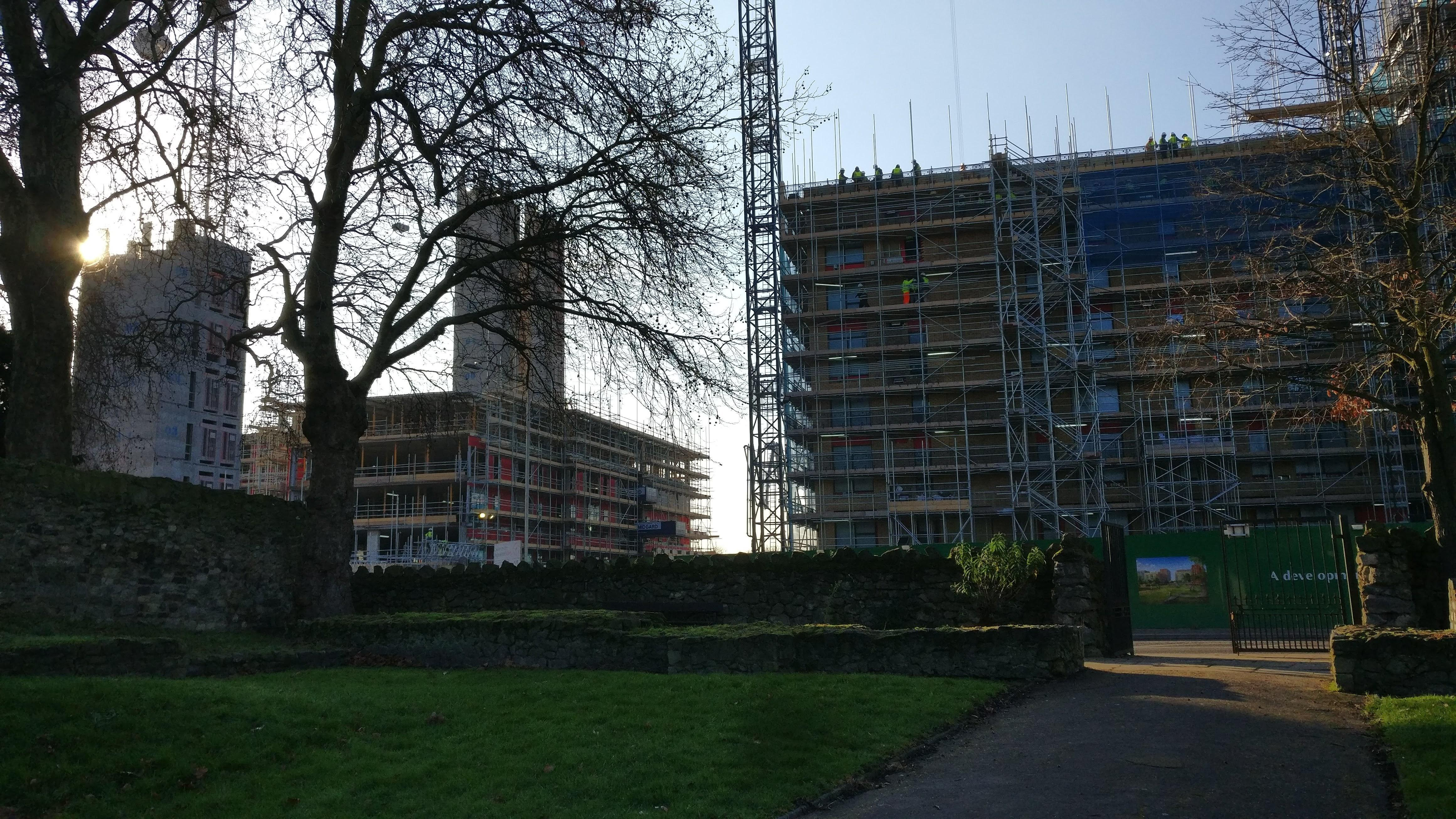
- Current building site
- Established: 2015
- Location: London Barking, IG11 7BB United Kingdom
- Coordinates: @51.533766, 0.075335
- Type: Women's museum
- Founders: Co-founder: Sara Huws, Sarah Jackson
- Director: Rachel Crossley
- Website: https://eastendwomensmuseum.org/

East End Women's Museum (EEWM) is a virtual, pop-up museum and the only dedicated women's museum in England. It was established in 2015 as a positive protest to a "Jack the Ripper Museum" in Cable Street. While the EEWM sought to open a permanent location in Barking town centre in 2023, the museum faced difficulties finalising the lease. The museum continues to have a pop-up museum that hosts temporary exhibitions—both online and in-person—as well as community workshops and educational events.

== Mission ==
The mission of the East End Women's Museum (EEWM) is to "Research, record, share and celebrate the stories of east London women past and present."

== About the museum ==
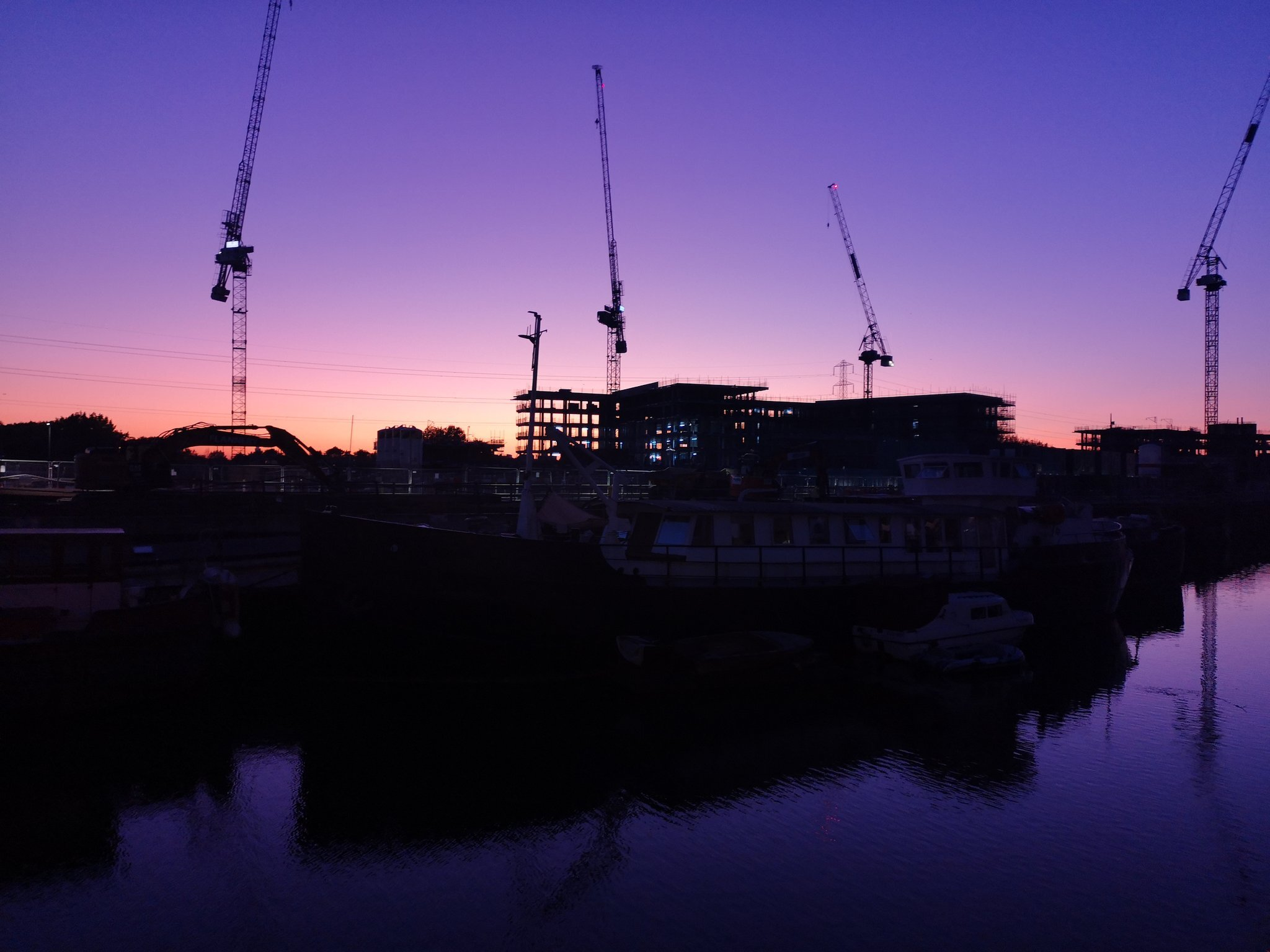
Construction site in 2020

East End Women's Museum (EEWM) is a small museum dedicated to the stories and voices of women of east London. Its aim is "to give representation to all women, particularly those traditionally marginalised, including women of colour, women with disabilities, lesbian and bi women, trans women, working-class women, older women, women from migrant or itinerant communities, women who are refugees or asylum-seeking, and women working in the sex industry." Women are underrepresented within British historical record and female voices have often been overlooked; for example, only 14% of English Heritage's blue plaques honour women. In order to provide more opportunities for female voices, its goal is to challenge gender inequality and encourage women to express their thoughts and tell their own stories.

=== History ===
East London, including but extending beyond the East End of London, has been a place full of intense political activism and women's equality movements. England's ‘first feminist’, Mary Wollstonecraft, spent her early childhood at Barking. The matchgirls' strike of 1888 occurred at the Bryant & May match factory in Bow. The sewing machinists strike at Ford Dagenham in 1968 was a landmark labour-relations dispute which led to the passing of the Equal Pay Act 1970.

The suffragette movement was strong in the area. When Sylvia Pankhurst and her followers were expelled from the Women's Social and Political Union in 1912, they set up the East London Federation of Suffragettes. The last surviving suffragette, Annie Clara Huggett, lived locally and has a women's centre in Dagenham named after her.

== Past projects and activities ==
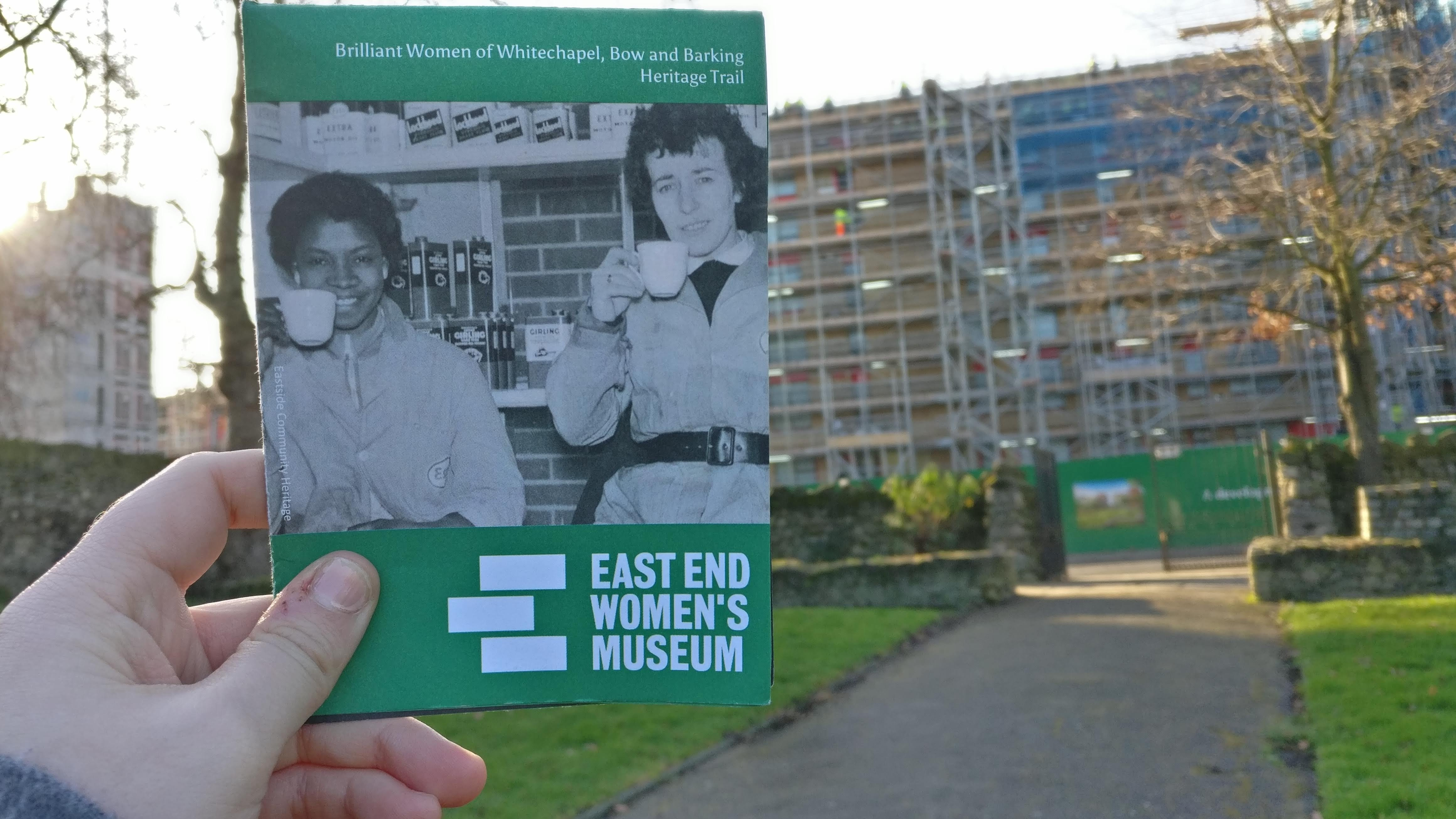
“EEWM Heritage trial” Flyers and construction site in 2020

As a virtual, pop-up museum, the EEWM seeks to engage local communities through temporary exhibitions, workshops, talks and events, different research, online learning and touring around East London. Its pop-up exhibitions have been all over East London:

=== 2016 ===
- "East End Women: The Real Story" (2016–2017) was a pop-up exhibition celebrating and sharing women's involvement and leadership around social and political change in the East End. It was funded by the "38 Degrees" and built by the East End Women's Collective, in which EEWM was a partner.

=== 2017 ===
- "Women at Watney: Voices from an East End market" was an exhibition in partnership with King's College London and University College London that captured women's memories of Watney Market through recorded interviews. It was funded by the London Arts and Humanities Partnership.

=== 2018 ===
- "The Women's Hall: Celebrating the East London Federation of the Suffragettes" was a project that examined and explored the original women's hall headquarters and some lesser-known suffrage stories. It consisted of two major exhibitions, a series of events, and a participatory photography project. It was run in partnership with Tower Hamlets Local History Library and Archives, Four Corners Gallery, Alternative Arts and NUMBI Arts.
- "Making her mark: 100 years of women's activism in Hackney" was an exhibition about women-led activism in Hackney from 1918 until today. It was a collaboration with Hackney Museum and Hackney Archives, plus an advisory group and a volunteer research team.

=== 2020 ===
- "EEWM Heritage Trail" is a self-guided trail which allowed the public to trace 14 locations of both popular and lesser known stories regarding East London women, such as Annie Brewster.

== See also ==
- East End of London
- Glasgow Women's Library
- Feminist Library
- Women's Library
- Vagina Museum
