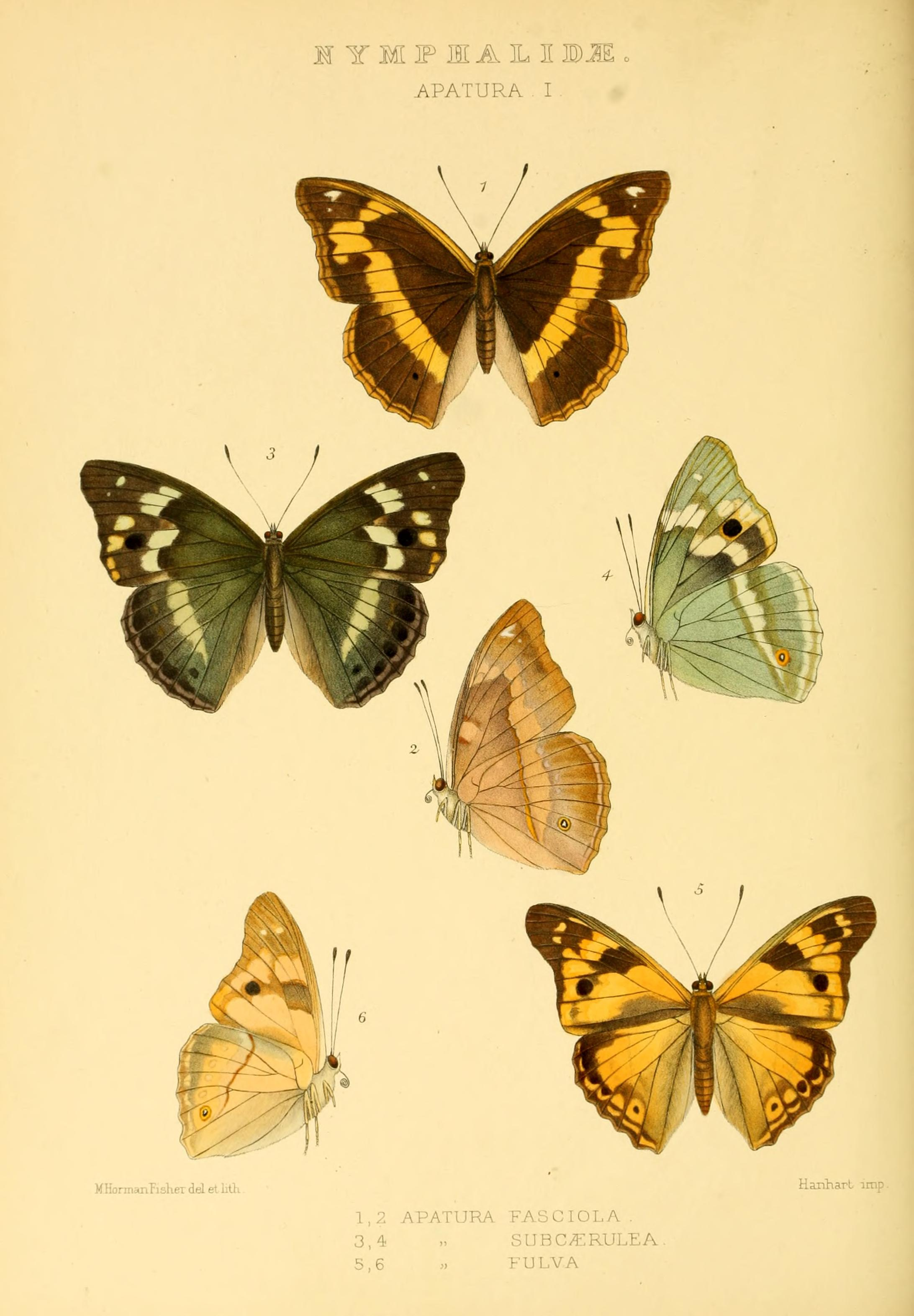

Scientific classification
- Domain: Eukaryota
- Kingdom: Animalia
- Phylum: Arthropoda
- Class: Insecta
- Order: Lepidoptera
- Family: Nymphalidae
- Genus: Chitoria
- Species: C. fasciola

Binomial name
- Chitoria fasciola (Leech, 1891)

= Chitoria fasciola =

Chitoria subcaerulea

Species of butterfly

Chitoria fasciola is a species of nymphalid butterfly endemic to China.
