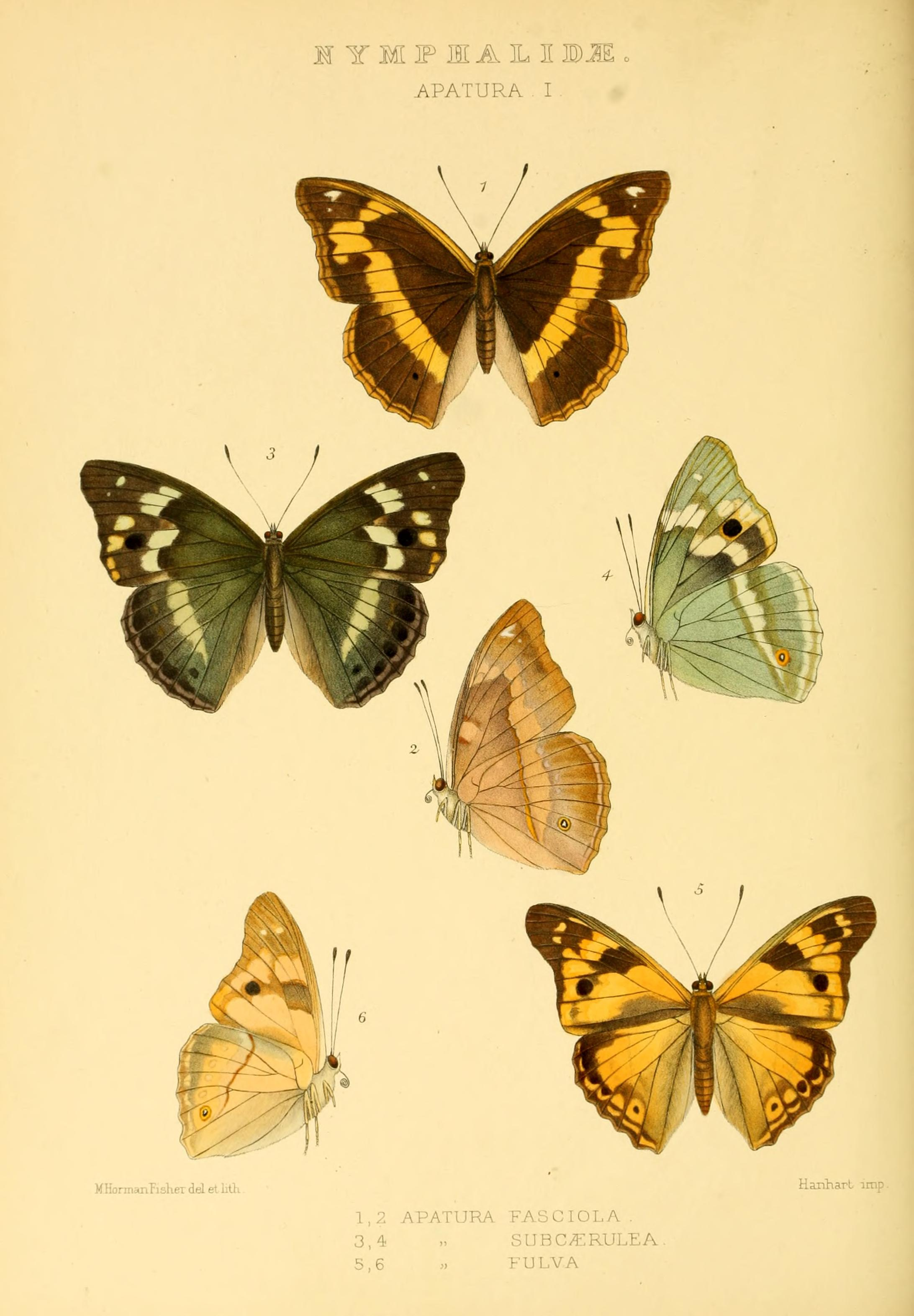

Scientific classification
- Kingdom: Animalia
- Phylum: Arthropoda
- Class: Insecta
- Order: Lepidoptera
- Family: Nymphalidae
- Genus: Chitoria
- Species: C. subcaerulea

Binomial name
- Chitoria subcaerulea (Leech, 1891)

= Chitoria subcaerulea =

Species of butterfly

Chitoria subcaerulea is a species of nymphalid butterfly endemic to China (Omei-Shan).
