= Vice-chancellor (disambiguation) =

A vice-chancellor is the chief executive of a British or Commonwealth university (also used in some American universities)

Vice-chancellor may also refer to:

- Vice-Chancellor of the Holy Roman Church, a former papal office
- Chancellor of the High Court of Justice of England and Wales, a British judicial position, formerly known as the Vice-Chancellor
- Vice-chancellor, a judge of the Delaware Court of Chancery in the United States
- Vice-Chancellor of Austria, the deputy head of government of Austria
- Vice-Chancellor of Germany, the deputy head of government of Germany
- Swiss Vice-Chancellor, one of two senior deputies to the Swiss Federal Chancellor
- Generally, somebody whose duties are to assist a chancellor

== See also ==
- Chancellor (disambiguation)
