= The Chancellor (disambiguation) =

Chancellor is a political title.

The Chancellor may also refer to:

- Robert R. Livingston (1746–1813), American lawyer, politician, diplomat and founding father
- The Survivors of the Chancellor, 1875 novel written by Jules Verne

== See also ==
- Chancellor (disambiguation)
- The Chancellor Manuscript, 1977 novel by Robert Ludlum
- The Emperor (disambiguation)
