= Jack the Ripper Museum =

Museum in London

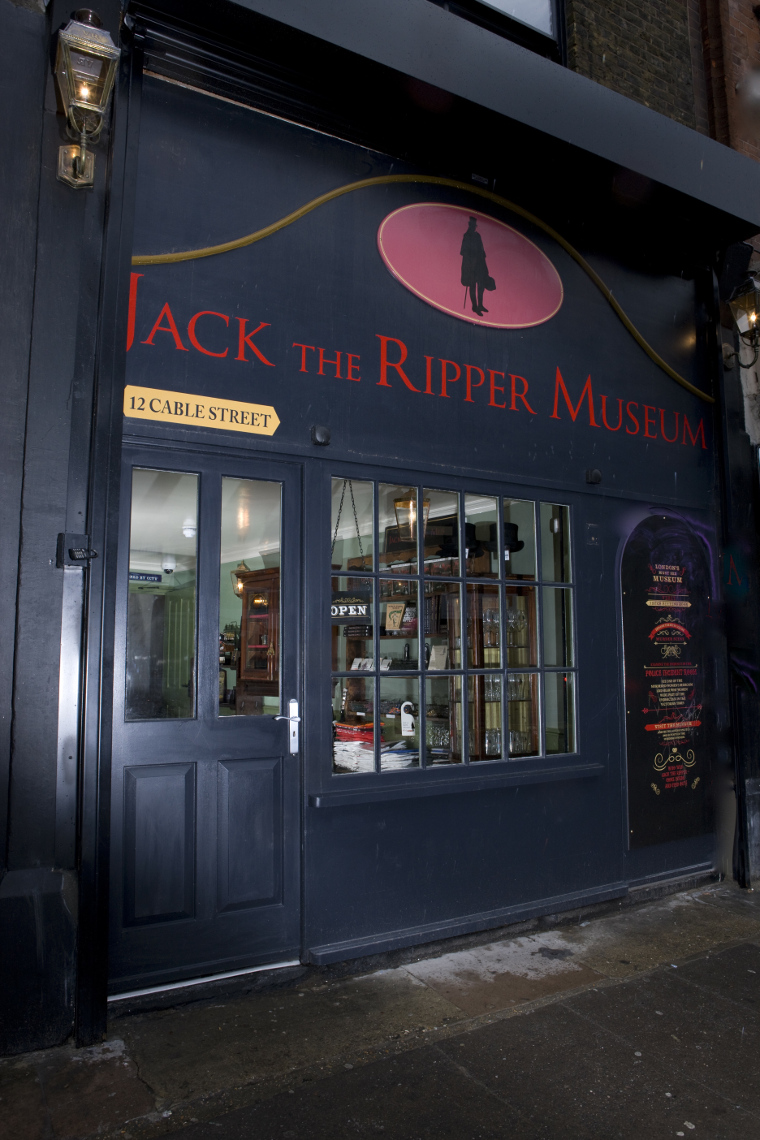
- Jack the Ripper Museum in 2015
- Location: 12 Cable Street, Tower Hamlets, London, E1 8JG
- Coordinates: 51.510805°N 0.067972°W
- Website: www.jacktherippermuseum.com

The Jack the Ripper Museum is a museum and tourist attraction that opened in August 2015 in Cable Street, London. It recreates the East End of London setting in which the unsolved Jack the Ripper murders took place in 1888, and exhibits some original artefacts from the period as well as waxwork recreations of crime scenes and sets. The museum was founded by Mark Palmer-Edgecumbe, a former head of diversity for Google.

The project's planning application described it as a "Museum of Women's History". Its change of focus to Jack the Ripper was only revealed when the facade of the building became visible a year later, leading to numerous protests.

== Exhibits ==
The five-room exhibition includes a recreation of the police station in Leman Street where detectives attempted to identify the murderer, of the bedroom of victim Mary Jane Kelly, and the scene of Catherine Eddowes' murder, with an effigy of PC Edward Watkins standing over her. A mocked-up morgue in the basement includes shrines to the "canonical five" victims – Mary Ann Nichols, Annie Chapman, Elizabeth Stride, Catherine Eddowes and Mary Jane Kelly – as well as Emma Elizabeth Smith, Alice McKenzie and Frances Coles.

One exhibit is the whistle used by police constable Edward Watkins to summon help when he discovered the body of Eddowes, and the truncheon and notebook case he was carrying.

== Museum history ==
The change-of-use planning application from Palmer-Edgecumbe's architects in August 2014 described plans to convert the disused Victorian building into the "Museum of Women's History", which it described as the first women's museum in the United Kingdom. The application featured illustrations of suffragettes and equal pay campaigners, and made reference to the closure of Whitechapel's Women's Library in 2013, saying that this museum would be "the only dedicated resource in the East End to women’s history". The application stated: "The museum will recognise and celebrate the women of the East End who have shaped history, telling the story of how they have been instrumental in changing society. It will analyse the social, political and domestic experience from the Victorian period to the present day."

When covers were removed from the site in 2015, local residents were shocked to instead see a "Jack the Ripper Museum", dedicated to the unsolved murders of local women. They had not been informed of the museum's change of focus. Protests were repeatedly staged outside, with anti-gentrification organisation Class War threatening further protests after a Halloween event at which visitors were invited to pose for photographs with actors playing the killer and his mutilated victims.

Andrew Waugh, the museum's architect, described the venture as "salacious, misogynist rubbish" and described himself as having been "duped" into offering a low fee to work on a museum celebrating women in politics in the East End. Waugh said he would not have touched the project "with a bargepole" if he had known how it would ultimately be marketed. John Biggs, the mayor of Tower Hamlets, said that the council's planning officers had been "misled by the applicant". In 2016 the museum's owners were refused retrospective planning permission for its shop front and ordered to change the museum's signage and to remove the roller shutter installed without planning permission in 2015 after protestors smashed a window. The Planning Inspectorate considered the shop's frontage to be detrimental to Cable Street, a conservation area. By 2017 the museum had lost an appeal to the Secretary of State and failed to comply with the change of signage and removal of the shutter. In 2018 the museum redesigned its frontage.

The museum defended its position, Palmer-Edgecumbe saying that "We did plan to do a museum about social history of women but as the project developed we decided a more interesting angle was from the perspective of the victims of Jack the Ripper."

Palmer-Edgecumbe had been involved in an exhibition about the serial killer at the Museum of London Docklands in 2008, and was co-director of a "Jack the Ripper Museum (London) Limited" company in 2012. He said he had "clearly stated" during planning discussions that the Museum of Women's History would be based "to a large extent" on this Jack the Ripper exhibition, and that the planning document included a number of images from it.

== See also ==
- East End Women's Museum, a project started following the protests
