= Colin O'Brien (photographer) =

British photographer

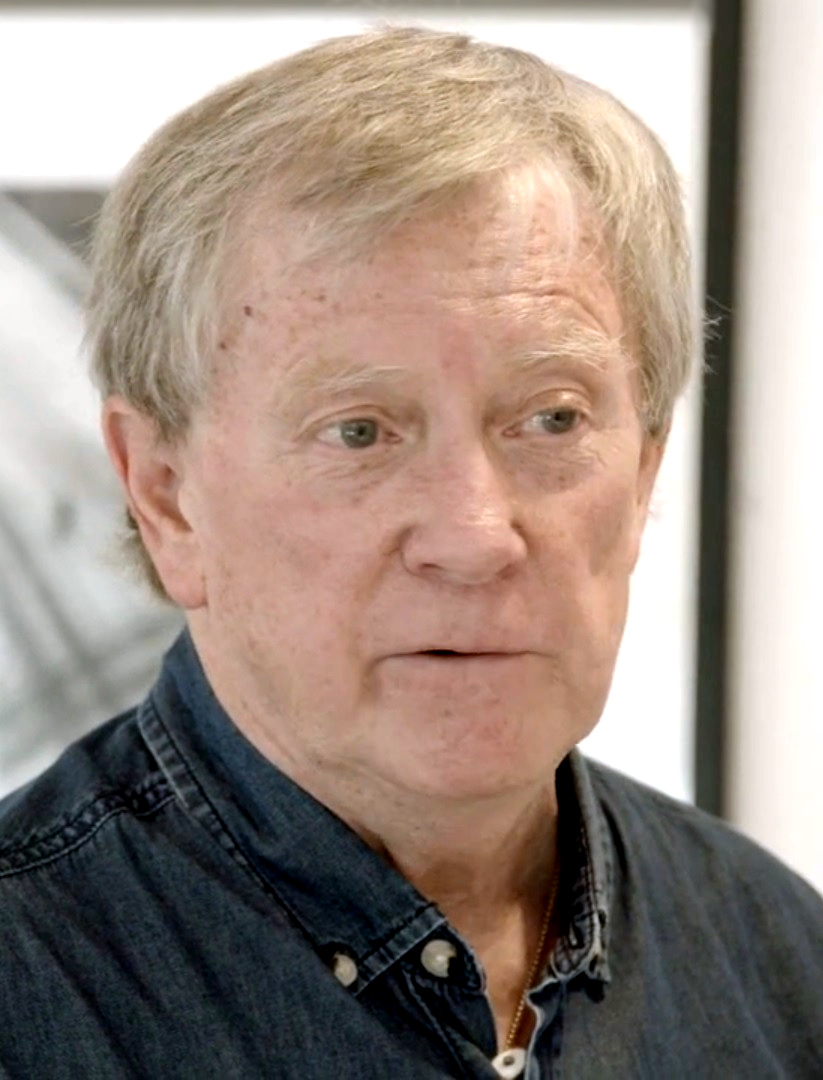
O'Brien at his '65' exhibition, Oxo Tower 2015

Colin O'Brien (8 May 1940 – 19 August 2016) was a British street photographer. He began documenting life in London in the 1950s and continued to do so for over 60 years, leaving behind a photographic archive of around half a million negatives. His notable publications are London Life (2015) and Travellers' Children in London Fields (2013).

== Early life ==
O’Brien began taking photos at age 8. He says his “first real photograph” was a photo of his two childhood friends against a car at Hatton Garden, Clerkenwell, in London in the area he was raised. At the time O’Brien shot with a Brownie box camera and an uncle gave him a contact printing set to help him develop his own film. His subjects were usually his family and landscapes, with his photo of the London skyline at night used on cover of the first edition of Bill Naughton’s Alfie, an adaptation of his play and was later turned into two films.

== Publications by O'Brien ==
- Retrospective Images. London: Pentagram Design, 2000. ISBN 9780902612174.
- Abstract Realities: Images of 20th Century Industrial Design London: The London Institute, 2001. ISBN 9780902612570.
- Travellers' Children in London Fields. London: Spitalfields Life Books, 2013. Edited by The Gentle Author.
- 65. London: They That Do, 2014. ISBN 978-0992776107. Edition of 1500 copies. "65 images spanning 65 years".
  - Boxed edition. London: They That Do, 2014. Included a print and a set of 10 postcards. Edition of 400 copies.
- London Life. London: Spitalfields Life Books, 2015. ISBN 978-0957656956.

== Exhibitions ==
=== Solo exhibitions ===
- Retrospective Images, Aberystwyth Arts Centre, Aberystwyth, Wales, May 2007.
- Travellers' Children, Genesis Cinema, Stepney, London, 2012.
- Travellers' Children in London Fields, Agnès b., Marylebone High Street, London, November–December 2013.
- London Life, Hackney Museum, Mare Street, London, June–Sept 2014.
- Leica Store City gallery, The Royal Exchange, London, 2015.
- London Life, The Society Club, Soho, London, June–August 2015.
- East London Life, Unit G Gallery, Hackney, London, July–August 2015.
- This England, Unit G Gallery, Hackney, London, October 2016.
- Decisive Moments (international retrospective), Unit G Gallery, Hanbury Hall, London, July–August 2017.

=== Exhibitions with others ===
- London Street Photography: 1860-2010, Museum of London, London, February–September 2011. Travelled to the Museum of the City of New York, July–December 2012.
- Playing In or Out?, V&A Museum of Childhood, Bethnal Green, London, March–November 2012. Film and photographs by O'Brien, Alec Brooking and John Heywood.
- Whitechapel: a Look Back, Darnley Gallery, Centre for Better Health, Hackney, London, part of Photomonth East London International Photography Festival, October 2014. Photographs by O'Brien and Alex Pink "taken before, during and immediately after the 2012 London Olympic Games."

== Collections ==
O'Brien's work is held in the following public collections:

- Museum of London, London
- Hackney Museum, London
