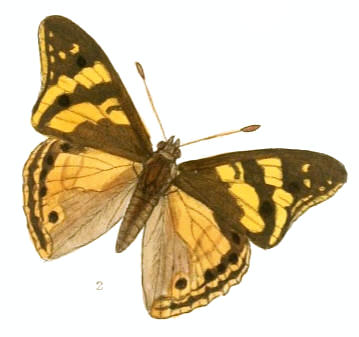
- Chitoria ulupi

Scientific classification
- Domain: Eukaryota
- Kingdom: Animalia
- Phylum: Arthropoda
- Class: Insecta
- Order: Lepidoptera
- Family: Nymphalidae
- Subfamily: Apaturinae
- Genus: Chitoria; Moore, 1896

Species
- See text

Synonyms
- Dravira Moore, 1896; Sincana Moore, 1896

= Chitoria =

Genus of brush-footed butterflies

Chitoria is a genus of butterflies in the family Nymphalidae found in Southeast Asia.

== Species ==
Listed alphabetically (Funet):

- Chitoria chrysolora (Fruhstorfer, 1908)
- Chitoria cooperi (Tytler, 1926)
- Chitoria fasciola (Leech, 1890)
- Chitoria leei Lang，2009 - Hubei (Province, Mt. Shennongjia)
- Chitoria modesta (Oberthür, 1906)
- Chitoria naga (Tytler, 1915) Yunnan
- Chitoria pallas (Leech, 1890)
- Chitoria sordida (Moore, [1866])
- Chitoria subcaerulea (Leech, 1891)
- Chitoria ulupi (Doherty, 1889)
- Chitoria vietnamica Nguyen, 1979
