= Chancellor (disambiguation) =

Chancellor is a political title. it often refers to the following:

- Chancellor of Germany
- Chancellor of Austria
- Federal Chancellor of Switzerland
- Chancellor of the Exchequer

Chancellor may also refer to:

== Titles ==
- Chancellor (ecclesiastical), a church official
- Chancellor (education), a university official
- Chancellor (Masonic), an officer in some lodges of Freemasons
- Chancellor, a presiding judge in a Court of Chancery in the United States
- Supreme Chancellor, a fictional senate position in Star Wars. (see Palpatine)

== Places ==
=== United States ===
- Chancellor, Alabama, an unincorporated community
- Chancellor, South Dakota, a town
- Chancellor, Virginia, an unincorporated community

=== Canada ===
- Chancellor, Alberta, a hamlet
- Chancellor Peak, a mountain summit in British Columbia

== People ==
- Chancellor (surname)
- Chancellor (musician), an American musician based in South Korea
- Philip the Chancellor, French medieval composer

== Companies ==
- Chancellor Media Corporation, a media company acquired by Clear Channel Communications in 2000
- Chancellor Records, a record label
- Hotel Grand Chancellor, a hotel chain in Australia

== Others ==
- Chancellor (chess), a fairy chess piece
- Chancellor (grape), a hybrid grape variety
- Cessna Model 414 Chancellor
- Chancellor’s Pudding, a food

== See also ==
- The Chancellor (disambiguation)
- Vice-chancellor (disambiguation)
