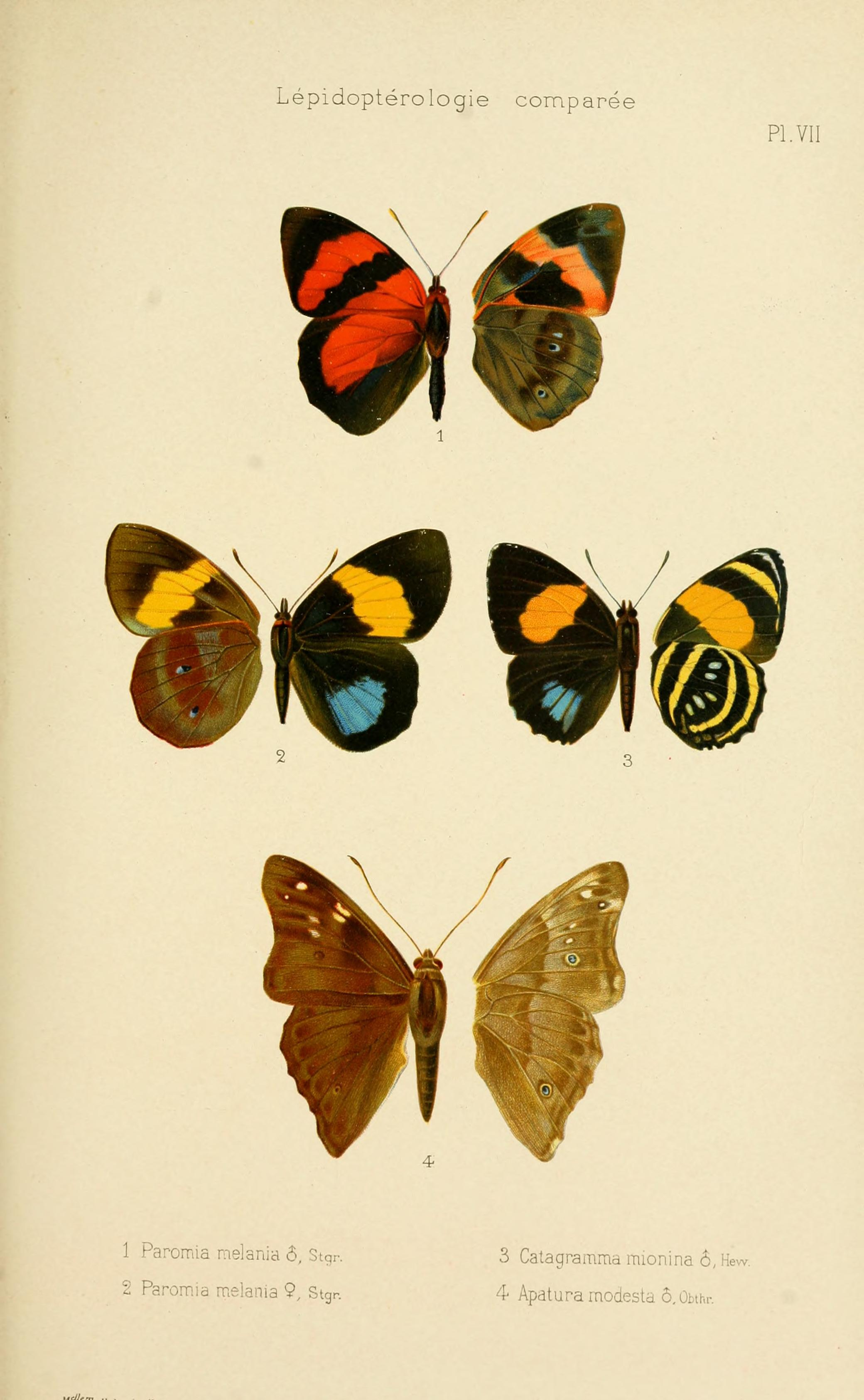
- Chitoria modesta in Étud. Lépid. Comp. figure 4

Scientific classification
- Domain: Eukaryota
- Kingdom: Animalia
- Phylum: Arthropoda
- Class: Insecta
- Order: Lepidoptera
- Family: Nymphalidae
- Genus: Chitoria
- Species: C. modesta

Binomial name
- Chitoria modesta (Oberthür, 1906)

= Chitoria modesta =

Species of butterfly

Chitoria modesta is a butterfly found in the East Palearctic that belongs to the browns family. It is endemic to Southwest China (Yunnan)

== Description from Seitz ==
A. modesta Oberth. is similar in shape to A. fasciola [Chitoria fasciola] (p. 164) and does not appear to be specifically distinct. Upperside brown, forewing with an indistinct darker shadowy median band, likewise with a somewhat darker shade in the apical and distal marginal areas. On the distal side of the shadowy band, near the costa, there is an elongate whitish double spot, above and below the middle of the anterior median branch two small more indistinct light spots, and near the apex a small rounded white spot with a white dot below it. Both wings have a small indistinct ocellus in the anal area. The hindwing bears a dark edge to the outer margin and a feebly marked submarginal row of spots. Beneath paler, the basal half of both wings somewhat darkened, these spots with sharply defined S-shaped edges, otherwise the light spots as above, the ocelli with blue centre, at the distal margin of both wings a narrow dark shadowy band and indistinct submarginal spots. — Western China: Siao-lou, Moupin, Tieatsuen. The author compares modesta with A. phaeacia Hew.; we cannot see any close affinity; but we learn from this remark by Oberthür that phaeacia, an Indian species, extends northward to Tse-kou (Tibet). It will be dealt with in the volume on the Exotics.
