= HMAS Australia =

Two ships of the Royal Australian Navy (RAN) have been named HMAS Australia. A third ship was to receive the name, but her transfer from the Royal Navy to the Royal Australian Navy was cancelled:

- The first HMAS Australia (1911), an Indefatigable-class battlecruiser launched in 1911, shortly after the formation of the Royal Australian Navy, and sunk in 1924 in accordance with the terms of the Washington Naval Treaty.
- The second HMAS Australia (D84), a County-class heavy cruiser launched in 1927 and broken up in 1956.
- The third HMAS Australia was intended to be renamed from the aircraft carrier HMS Invincible (R05), which the RAN intended to purchase in 1982. This sale was cancelled following the Falklands War and the 1983 Australian federal election.

== Battle honours ==
Ships named HMAS Australia are entitled to carry ten battle honours:

- Rabaul 1914
- North Sea 1915–18
- Atlantic 1940–41
- Pacific 1941–43
- Coral Sea 1942
- Savo Island 1942
- Guadalcanal 1942
- New Guinea 1942–44
- Leyte Gulf 1944
- Lingayen Gulf 1945

== See also ==
- HMS Australia (1886), an Orlando-class cruiser of the Royal Navy completed in 1888 and scrapped in 1905.
- Empress of Australia, three passenger vessels of the name
