= RMS Empress of Britain =

RMS Empress of Britain may refer to one of these Canadian Pacific Steamship Company ocean liners:

- RMS Empress of Britain (1905), 14,189-gross register ton ship capable of 18 knots; scrapped in 1930
- RMS Empress of Britain (1930), 42,348-gross register ton ship capable of 24 knots; torpedoed and sunk 28 October 1940 by German U-boat U-32, the largest ship sunk by a U-boat in World War II
- RMS Empress of Britain (1955), a 25,500-gross register ton ship capable of 20 knots; one of the first North Atlantic liners to have air conditioning; sister ship of Empress of England; liner service until 1963; sold to a number of different companies and has served under many different names, mostly as a cruise ship in 2008, she was sold for scrap
