= Empress of Australia =

Three ships have borne the name Empress of Australia:

- RMS Empress of Australia (1919), a 21,560-ton ocean liner launched in 1913 by Vulcan AG shipyard in Stettin (now Szczecin, Poland) for the Hamburg America Line as SS Tirpitz. She was taken as a war reparation in 1919 and sold to Canadian Pacific Steamships and was renamed firstly Empress of China in 1921 and then Empress of Australia in 1922.
- RMS Empress of Australia (1924), an ocean liner launched in 1924 by Cammell Lairds at Birkenhead as the 17,759-ton De Grasse. She was renamed Empress of Australia in 1953 and served with Canadian Pacific Steamships until 1956, when she was renamed Venezuela. She was wrecked off Cannes on 16 March 1962 and broken up at La Spezia in August the same year.
- MS Empress of Australia, a 12,037-ton ferry which was launched in 1964 at Cockatoo Island Dockyard and operated by the Australian National Line until 1985.

== See also ==
- HMAS Australia
