= West India Dock Road =

Street in the London Borough of Tower Hamlets

Coordinates: 51°30′38.89″N 0°1′37.78″W

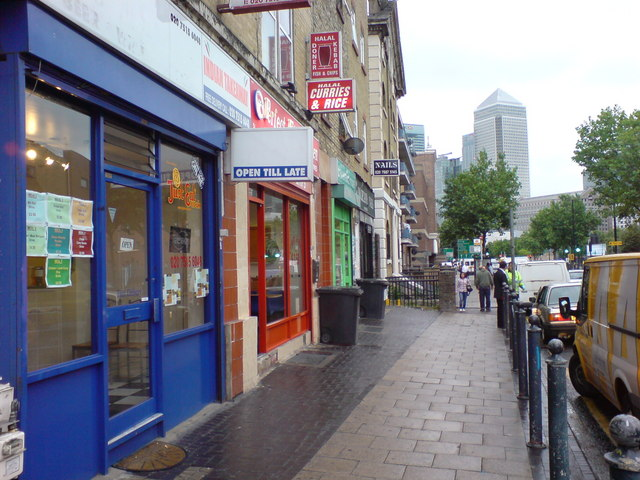
Looking down West India Road from the junction with Commercial Road. Canary Wharf is visible in the distance.

West India Dock Road is a road in Limehouse to Poplar. It connects Commercial Road with the entrance to the West India Docks.

== History ==
Ralph Walker, engineer of the West India Dock company, laid the road out in 1802. A single storey building served as a toll booth until 1871.

Historic buildings on the road include the Strangers' Home for Asiatics, Africans and South Sea Islanders (opened 1857, demolished 1937) and the West India Docks railway station (opened 6 July 1840, closed 3 May 1926).
