= Strangers' Home for Asiatics, Africans and South Sea Islanders =

Residential home London, that provided accommodation for non-European sailors

Coordinates: 51.5111°N 0.0271°W

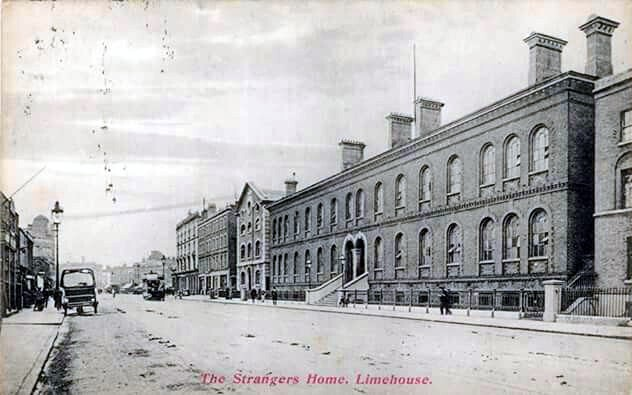
The Strangers' Home

The Strangers' Home for Asiatics, Africans and South Sea Islanders (opened 1857) was a residential home in West India Dock Road, in the Limehouse district of London, that provided accommodation for Asian and black sailors (lascars), acted as a "repatriation centre" and was a platform for Christian missionary activity.

== Foundation ==
The home was founded after an appeal by Lieutenant Colonel R. M. Hughes, previously of the East India Company, and Joseph Salter of the London City Mission. The first donation was of £500 from Maharaja Duleep Singh, followed by a regular revenue from the East India Company and a lesser contribution from the Peninsula and Oriental Steam Navigation Company (later P&O). The architect was C.L. Bracebridge.

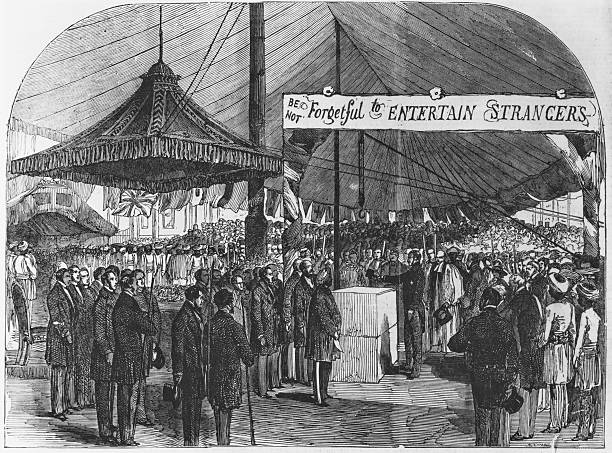
Prince Albert lays the foundation stone of the Strangers' Home, 31 May 1856

On 31 May 1856, the foundation stone was laid by Prince Albert and the Home finally opened in 1857. It was one of a number of homes founded in the area to deal with the problem of unemployed or destitute sailors.

== Activities ==
The home served as a repatriation centre where sailors could be sought and re-employed for return journeys to the East. It also provided temporary board and lodgings and functioned as a missionary centre. It was described by Count E. Armfelt in Living London (c. 1902) as having "reading and smoking and bagatelle rooms, bedrooms, baggage rooms, kitchens, and dining rooms, where every individual can cook and eat his meal with the ritual which his conscience commands him, undefiled by even the shadow of an infidel." More than 5,000 individuals were accommodated between 1857 and 1877.

Joseph Salter was one missionary from the Home that gave graphic accounts of the lives of the lascars who frequently took refuge here.

A Chinese community grew around the Home and the 1881 census recorded that of the 22 people who lived there, eleven were born in China, six in India or Sri Lanka, two in Arabia, two in Singapore and one in the Kru Coast of Africa. In 1886 the Home informed the India Office that they were evicting five Punjabi performers and a bear who could not pay their bills. In 1899, when Major General Chamier was honorary secretary of the Home, a group of eighteen Indian and Sri Lankan performers from a travelling show were left destitute at Marylebone station and took refuge at the Home after being dismissed by their manager.

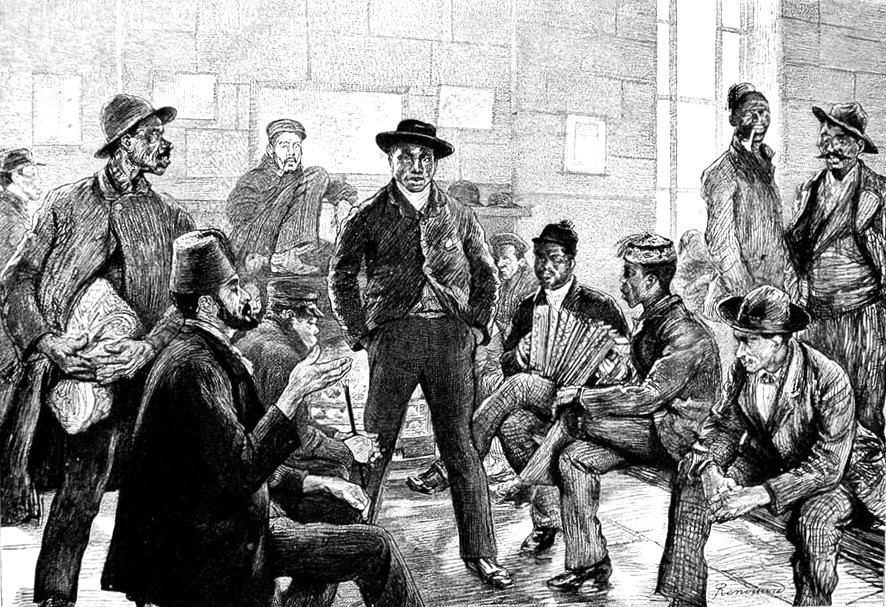
Great Hall at the Strangers' Home, The Graphic, September 1889

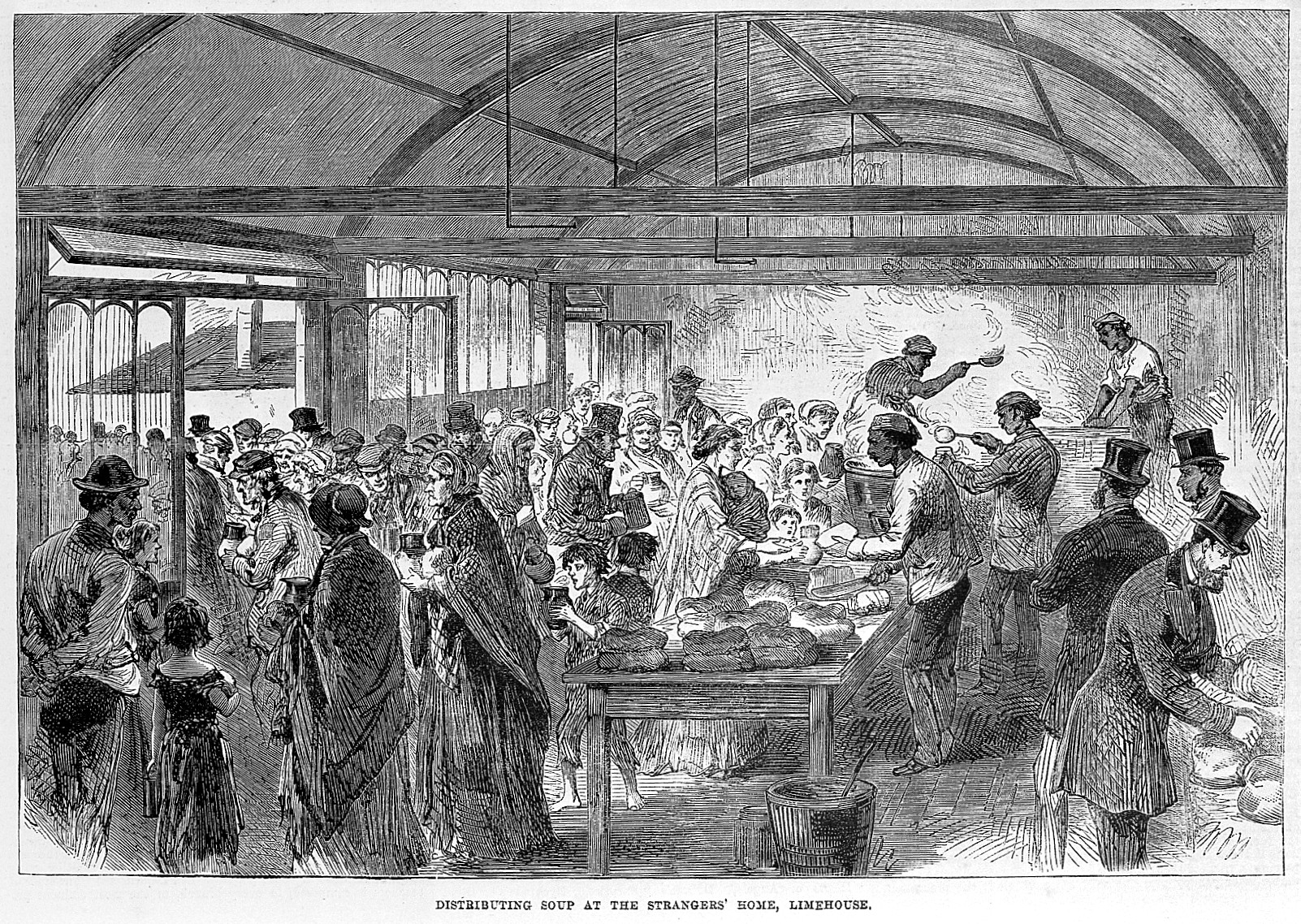
"Distributing Soup at the Strangers' Home, Limehouse", The Illustrated London News

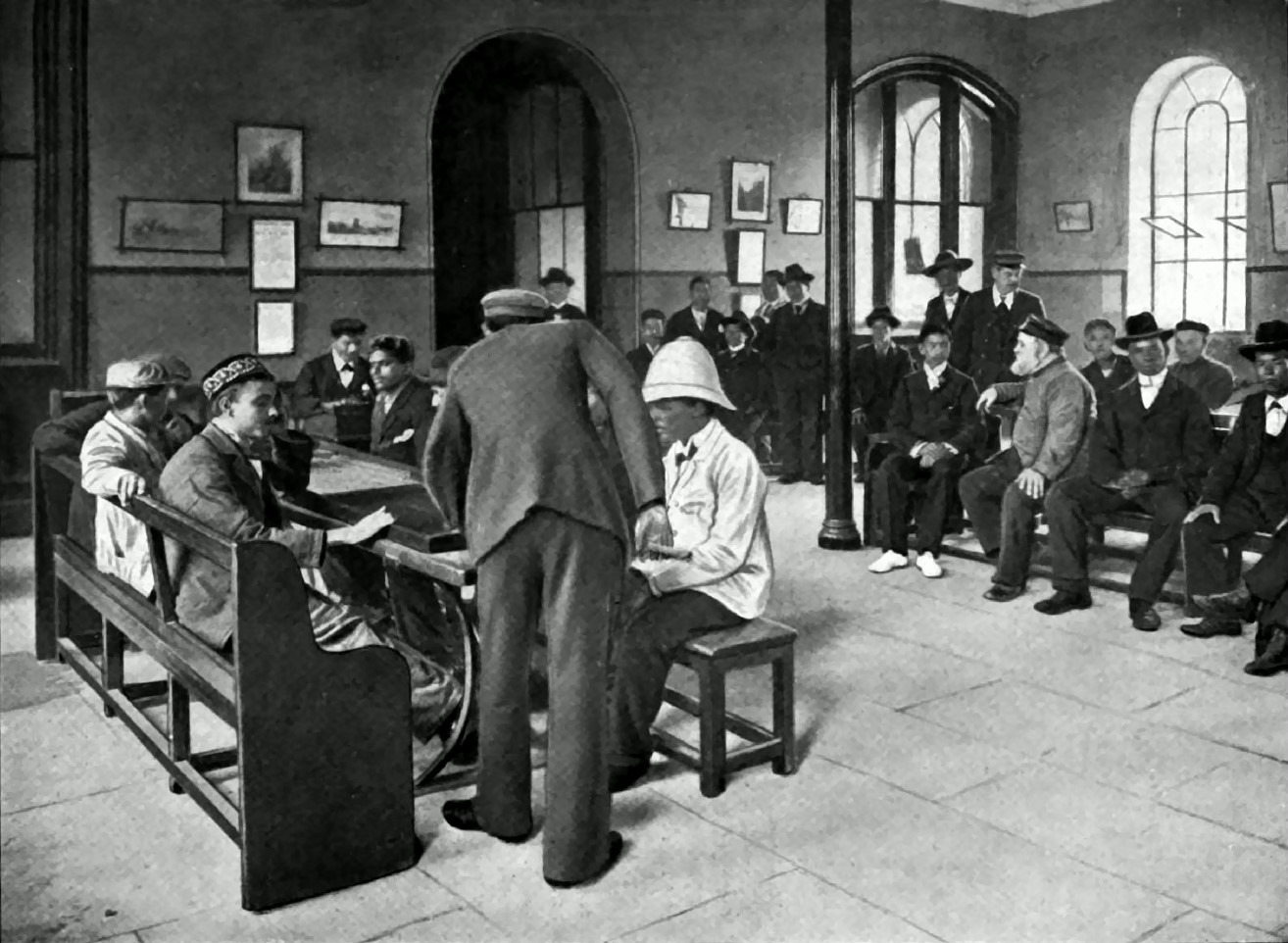
"In the Main Hall of the Strangers' Home, West India Dock", Living London, c. 1902

== Closure ==
A lack of funds and the reduced numbers of sailors in need of help led to the closure of the Home in 1937. The site is now occupied by flats known as West India House, opened in 1946 by Clement Attlee.
