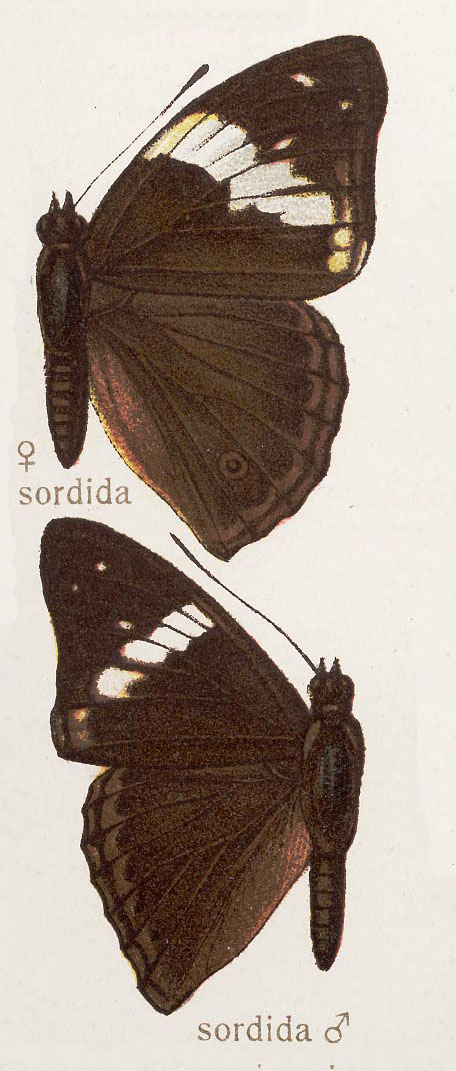

Scientific classification
- Domain: Eukaryota
- Kingdom: Animalia
- Phylum: Arthropoda
- Class: Insecta
- Order: Lepidoptera
- Family: Nymphalidae
- Genus: Chitoria
- Species: C. sordida

Binomial name
- Chitoria sordida (Moore, 1865)

Synonyms
- Apatura sordida

= Chitoria sordida =

Sordid emperor

Species of butterfly

Chitoria sordida, the sordid emperor, is a species of nymphalid butterfly found in tropical Asia.

== Description ==
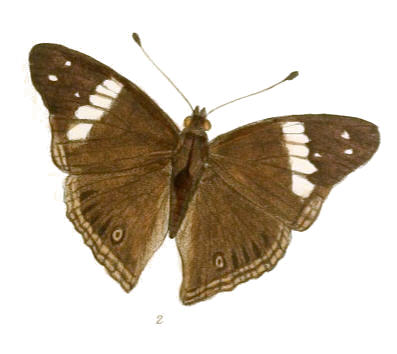

The males have the upperside of the forewing darkening towards the apex, the apical two-thirds much darker brown, an oblique discal white band from interspace 6 to tornal angle formed of more or less rectangular spots; a small spot beyond in interspace 4 and two preapical spots white. Hindwing uniform, a lunular subterminal dark line inwardly bordered by a row of dark spots, and a terminal row of pale lunules. Underside pale brownish grey. Forewing with the discal band and spots more or less as on the upperside; a black, blind, yellow-ringed ocellus, with a dark brown shade in the interspace below it; ocellus and brown shading bordered inwardly by white; a subterminal dark line, and some diffuse white marks on termen below apex and at tornus. Hindwing with an incomplete discal white band and a series of white spots beyond, ending in a well-marked, broadly yellow-ringed, blue-centred, black ocellus in interspace 2; lastly, a subterminal dark line as in the forewing. Antennae brown, paler below the club; head, thorax and abdomen brown, paler beneath.

The female is similar; the hindwing is more rounded and the oblique discal band on the forewing is very much broader. The wingspan is 68–80 mm.

It is found in north-eastern India and South-East Asia.
