= HMS Empress =

Four ships of the Royal Navy have borne the name HMS Empress:

- HMS Empress was previously the 91-gun screw powered second rate HMS Revenge. She was renamed HMS Empress in 1891, on her conversion to a training ship. She was sold in 1923.
- HMS Empress (1906) was a tender, transferred from the War Department in 1906. She was renamed HMS Heron later that year and was sold in 1923.
- HMS Empress (1914) was a seaplane tender, originally launched as a merchant in 1907. She was requisitioned by the Navy between 1914 and 1919.
- HMS Empress (D42) was an escort carrier, originally USS Carnegie. She was transferred to the Royal Navy in 1943, and returned to the US Navy in 1946.

== See also ==
- HMS Empress Mary was a storeship purchased in 1799 and sunk in 1804 as a breakwater.
- HMS Empress of India (1891) was a Royal Sovereign-class battleship launched in 1891 and sunk as a target in 1913.
