= The Emperor =

In Japan, The Emperor refers to:

- Naruhito (born 1960), Emperor since 2019

The Emperor may also refer to any Monarch of any monarchy, as well as to:

== People ==
- Bob Hudson (1929–1997), American radio DJ, one half of comedy duo Hudson & Landry
- Fatih Terim, a Turkish association football manager and former player.
- Lim Yo-hwan (also known as SlayerS_`BoxeR`), a professional gamer.

== Fictional characters ==
- Emperor Palpatine, a character from the Star Wars franchise
- The God-Emperor of Mankind, in the science fantasy universe Warhammer 40,000
- The Emperor, a character from the video game Baldur's Gate 3.

== Literature ==
- The Emperor (book), a book by Ryszard Kapuściński on the last days of Emperor Haile Selassie of Ethiopia
- "The Emperor" (short story), written by Frederick Forsyth

== Film ==
- The Emperor (film)

== Other ==
- The Emperor (Tarot card)
- Piano Concerto No. 5 (Beethoven)
- Morpho peleides (the emperor), a butterfly
- Holy Roman Emperor

== See also ==
- Emperor
- Emperor (disambiguation)
- The Chancellor (disambiguation)
