= Empress, Georgia =

- Unincorporated community
- Location within the state of Georgia Empress, Georgia (the United States)
- Coordinates: 30°40′18″N 83°33′57″W
- Country: United States
- State: Georgia
- County: Brooks
- Elevation: 125 ft (38 m)
- Time zone: UTC-5 (Eastern (EST))
  - Summer (DST): UTC-4 (EDT)
- Area code: 229
- GNIS ID: 326266

Empress is an unincorporated community in Brooks County, Georgia, United States.
