= Empress Theatre (Fort Macleod) =

Not-for-profit theatre in Alberta

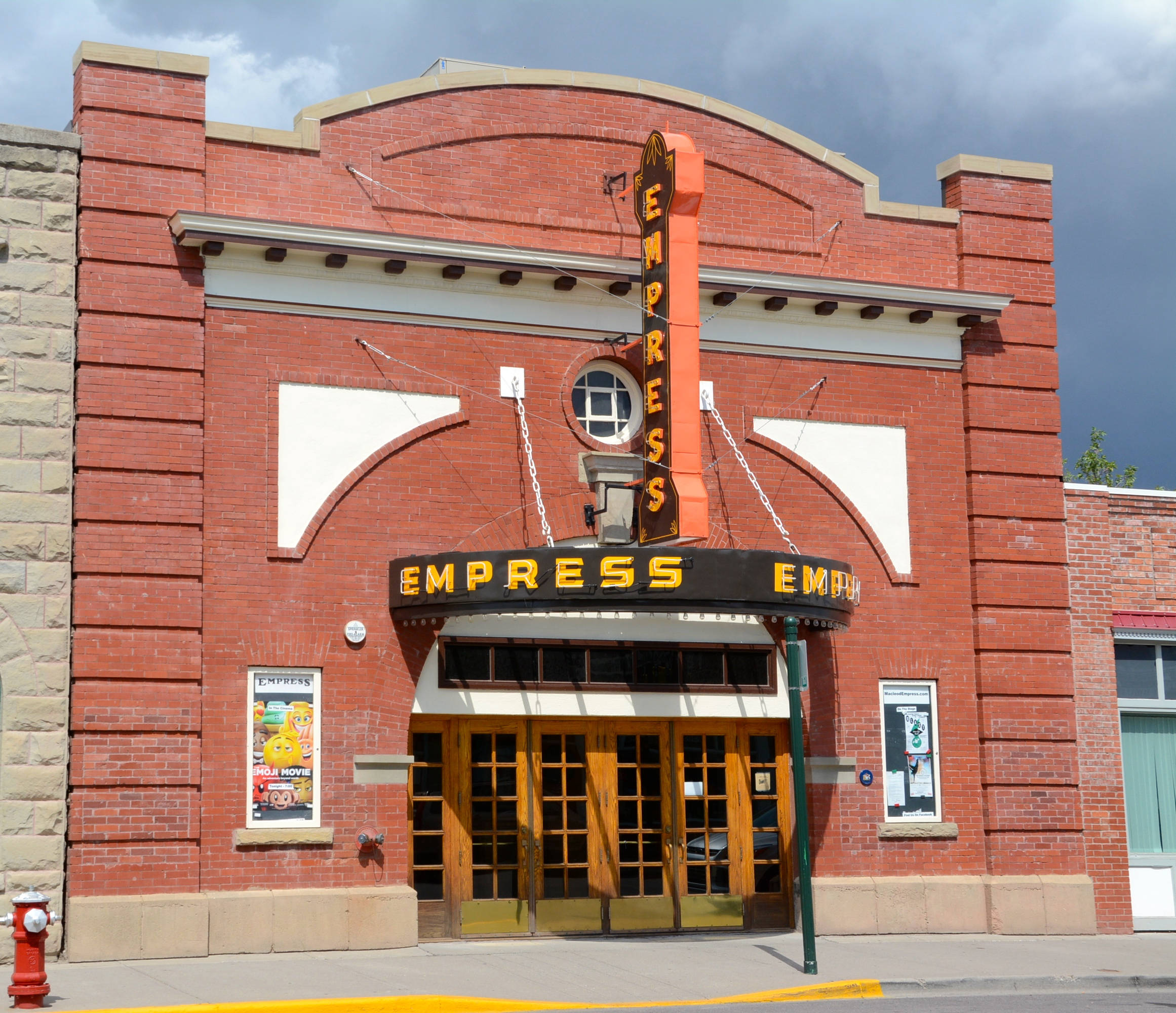
- Empress Theatre facade
- Interactive map of Empress Theatre
- Address: 235 Main Street, Fort Macleod, AB T0L 0Z0
- Coordinates: 49°43′33″N 113°24′27″W
- Owner: Town of Fort Macleod
- Operator: Empress Theatre Society

Construction
- Groundbreaking: 1910
- Opened: 1912
- Renovated: 1940s
- Builder: J.S. Lambert

Website
- www.macleodempress.com

The Empress is a not for profit theatre in Fort Macleod, Alberta that has been open since 1912.

== History ==
In January 1910 the Lethbridge Herald announced that a new opera house with orchestra pit would be built And it opened in 1912 as a vaudeville and theatrical performance venue for North-West Mounted Police.

== Architecture ==
It is a two-story brick building with a plain facade to match the existing streetscape. It still has its original interior balcony, seating, dressing rooms and projection booth.
