= Amah (occupation) =

Servant girl

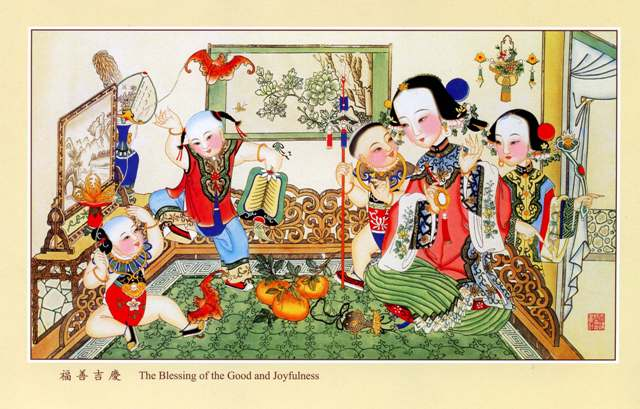
A Chinese amah (right) with a woman and her three children

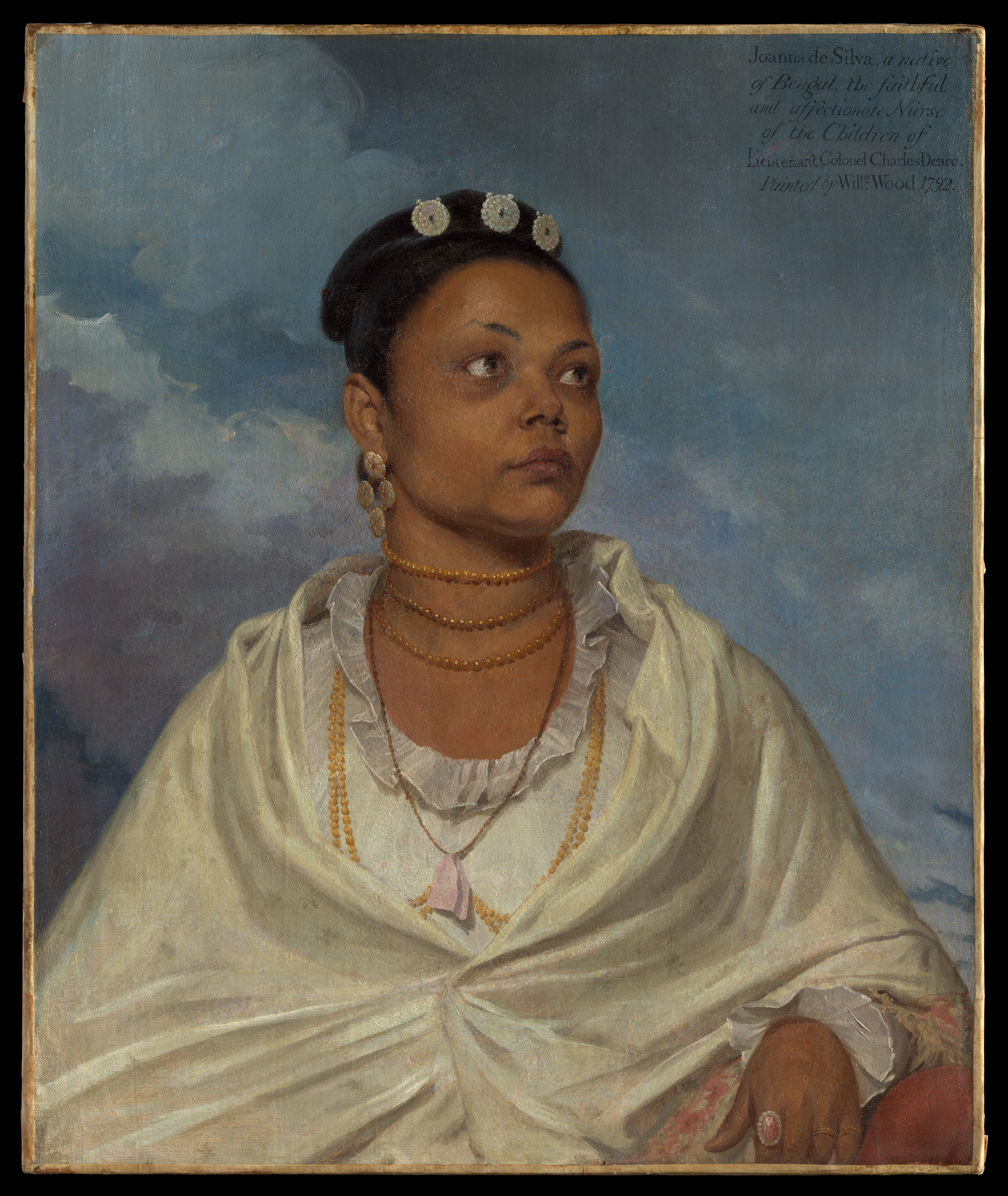
Joanna de Silva

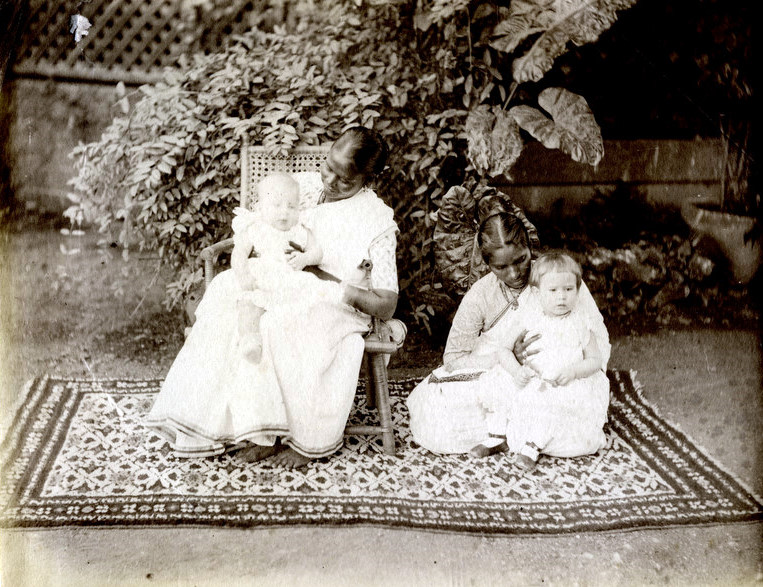
Two ayahs in British India with their charges

An amah (Portuguese: ama, German: Amme, Medieval Latin: amma, simplified Chinese: 阿妈; traditional Chinese: 阿媽; pinyin: ā mā; Wade–Giles: a¹ ma¹) or ayah (Portuguese: aia, Latin: avia, Tagalog: yaya) is a girl or woman employed by a family to clean, look after children, and perform other domestic tasks. Amah is the usual version in East Asia, while ayah relates more to South Asia, and tends to specifically mean a nursemaid looking after young children, rather than a general maid.

== Role ==
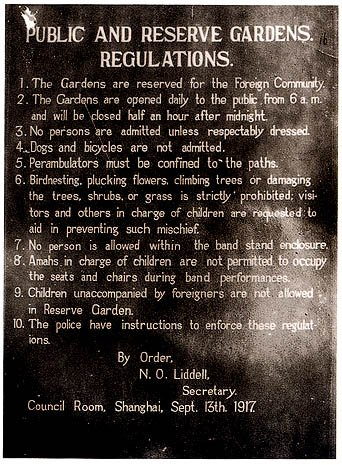
Regulations of Huangpu Park in 1917. There is a rule specifically for amahs.

It is a domestic servant role which combines functions of maid and nanny. They may be required to wear a uniform. The term, resembling the pronunciation for "mother" (see Mama and papa), is considered polite and respectful in the Chinese language.

Ayahs have been identified as a distinctive occupational group in India from the late eighteenth century, becoming the mainstay of childcare work during the periods of Company rule in India and the British Raj, as colonial wives and therefore children became more prevalent. Joanna de Silva, a native of Bengal, possibly of part Portuguese descent, was an early example of an ayah who travelled to Britain with her charges, and, more rarely, had her portrait painted by William Wood in 1792.

A rare written and signed agreement between Mina Ayah of 15 Free School Street, Calcutta, an Indian ayah and a British family, the Greenhills, was signed in 1896, and survives in the British Library. It lays out the terms of services for the voyage to Britain looking after two children, and Mina Ayah's return "£10.0.0. for my return passage unless Mrs Greenhill finds me a lady to return with".

Ayahs also worked in Singapore, Indian and Malay ayahs during the nineteenth and early twentieth century. By the 1930s, Chinese amahs were more prevalent in the Straits Settlements and Hong Kong.

The Indian and Chinese women were employed in households in South and South-East Asia and also accompanied British families, and children travelling without their parents, across the seas between Asia, Europe, and Australia.

In Hong Kong the word yaya became more common, by the 2010s, as Filipinas became domestic workers in that territory.

== Etymology ==
The word amah may have originated from the Arabic: أَمَةٌ, romanized: ʾamah, meaning "female slave"; or from the Portuguese ama, meaning "nurse". Some however argued that it is the English form of the Chinese word ah mah. Ah (阿; ā) is a common Chinese prefix used before monosyllabic names or kinship terms to indicate familiarity, and mah (妈; 媽; mā) means "mother". Others say that the word originated from the term for a wet nurse, nai mah (奶妈; 奶媽; nǎimā; 'milk mother'). This word is common in East Asia, Southeast Asia and South Asia to denote a maidservant or nursemaid.

Variants such as Amah-chieh or mahjeh (姐; jiě means elder sister in Chinese dialects) have also been used in some countries. In China, amah may even refer to any old lady in general. In Taiwan and southeastern China where the Minnan language is spoken, amah (Chinese: 阿媽; Pe̍h-ōe-jī: a‑má) refers to the paternal grandmother. Similar terms in the same context include ah-yee (Chinese: 阿姨; pinyin: āyí; Pe̍h-ōe-jī: a‑î; lit. 'aunt'), yee-yee (aunt), or jie-jie (elder sister). Since the mid-1990s, it has become more politically correct in some circles to call such a person a 'helper' rather than a maid or ayah.

== Other meanings ==
During the Tang dynasty in China, the word amah was used as an informal and poetic title for the Taoist goddess, the Queen Mother of the West. "Amah" also means mother in many countries.

== In English literature ==
Amah and ayah have been adopted as loanwords into the English language:

She never remembered seeing familiarly anything but the dark faces of her Ayah and the other native servants, and as they always obeyed her and gave her her own way in everything, because the Mem Sahib [her mother] would be angry if she was disturbed by her crying, by the time she was six years old she was as tyrannical and selfish a little pig as ever lived.
- The Secret Garden, by Frances Hodgson Burnett

When Tony and his sister arrived they wanted to go straight to the pond, but their ayah said they must take a sharp walk first, and as she said this she glanced at the time-board to see when the Gardens closed that night.
- The Little White Bird, by J.M. Barrie, author of Peter Pan

== See also ==
- Ayahs' Home, an organisation that provided accommodation and support to foreign nannies abandoned in London
