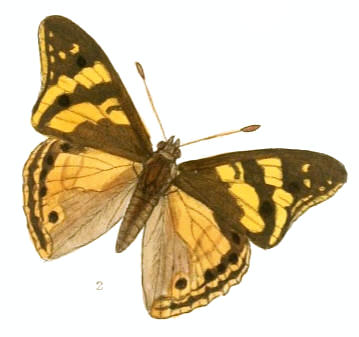

Scientific classification
- Kingdom: Animalia
- Phylum: Arthropoda
- Class: Insecta
- Order: Lepidoptera
- Family: Nymphalidae
- Genus: Chitoria
- Species: C. ulupi

Binomial name
- Chitoria ulupi (Doherty, 1889)

Synonyms
- Potamis ulupi Doherty, 1889; Apatura ulupi; Apatura kalaurica Tytler, 1926; Apatura fulva Leech, 1891

= Chitoria ulupi =

Tawny emperor

Species of butterfly

Chitoria ulupi, the tawny emperor, is a species of nymphalid butterfly found in tropical Asia.

The forewing length is 32–44 mm in males and 42–48 mm in females. Females are larger than males. The wings of males are brown with a merged, blurred yellow pattern covering the basal and posterior parts of the wing, as well as an oblique band on the forewing. The hindwings are yellow with a brown outer edge and marginal spots. The wings of the female are black on the upper side. The forewings have a broken row of white spots. The hindwing has a straight band directed toward the tornal angle, sometimes with a row of yellowish marginal spots and several small postdiscal spots. On the underside, the forewings are greenish-white at the base and apex, with a blurred pattern in males and a clearer one in females.

== Subspecies ==
- Chitoria ulupi arakii (Naritomi) (Taiwan)
- Chitoria ulupi dubernardi (Oberthür) (western China: Yunnan)
- Chitoria ulupi fulva Leech, 1891 (Korea, eastern China, Sichuan)
- Chitoria ulupi kalaurica Tytler, 1926 (Burma)
- Chitoria ulupi tong Yoshino, 1997 (Guanxi)
- Chitoria ulupi ulupi (Doherty, 1889) (Assam, Manipur, Burma)

== Gallery ==
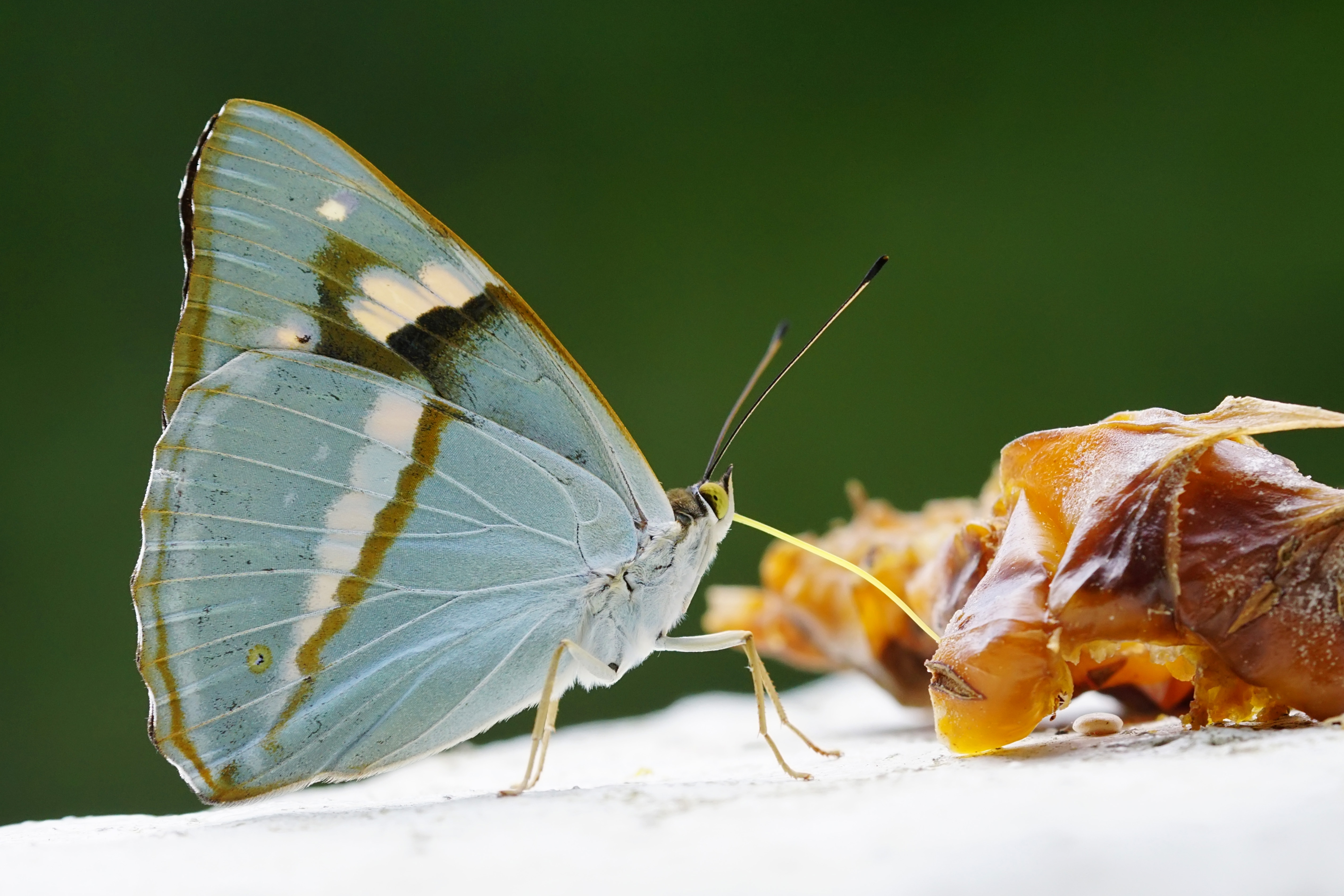
Chitoria ulupi arakii female

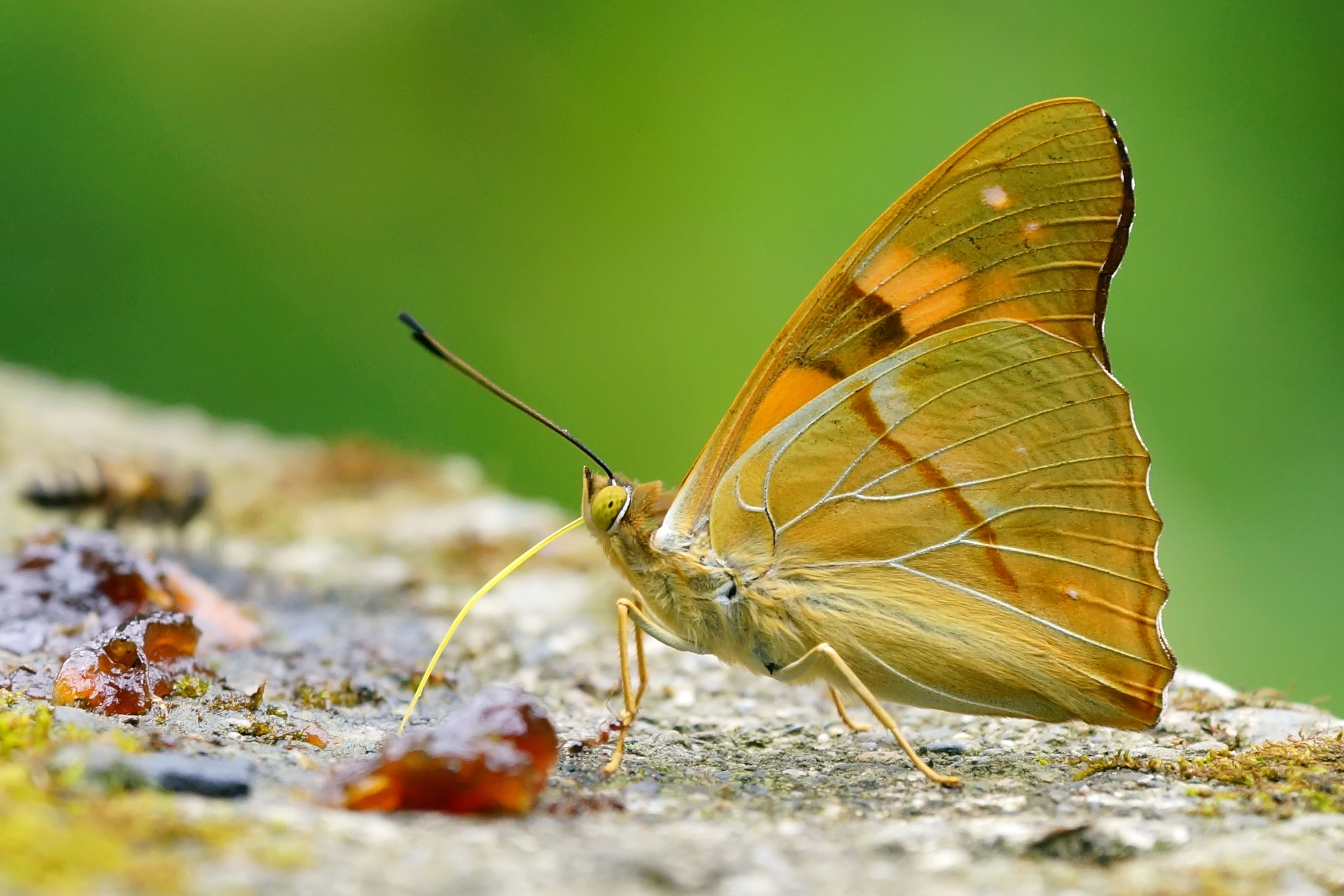
Chitoria ulupi arakii male
