= Hackney Museum =

Local history museum in London, England

Coordinates: 51°32′40.23″N 0°3′20.97″W

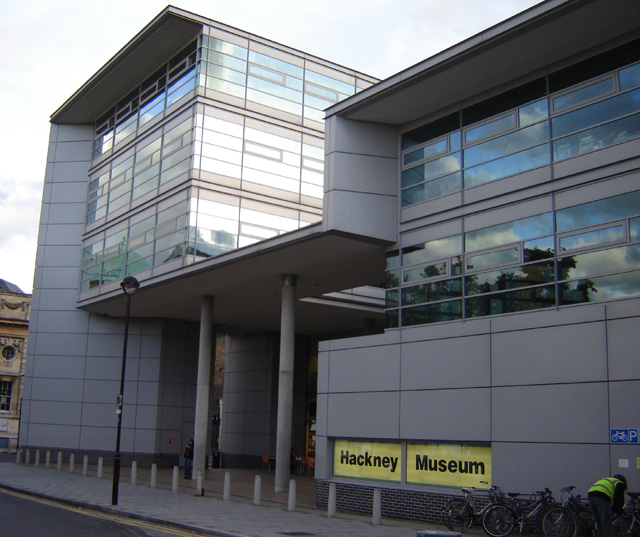
Hackney Technology and Learning Centre (includes Hackney Museum and Central Library)

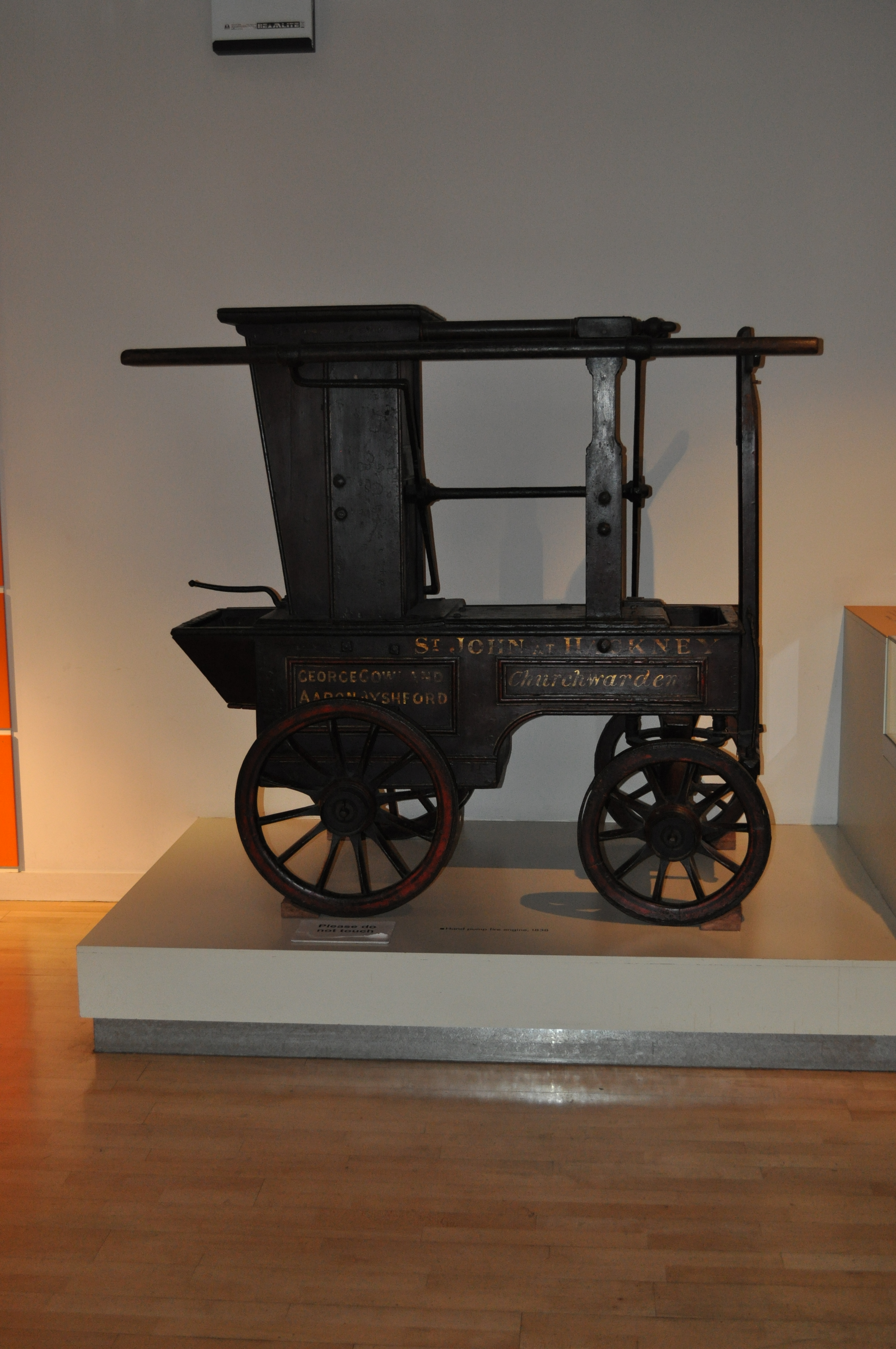
Hackney's first fire engine exhibited in the museum

Hackney Museum is a local history museum located in the London Borough of Hackney. Amongst other aspects of the Hackney area, the museum explores the history of immigration.
