= Hackberry =

Hackberry may refer to:

== Botany ==
- Celtis, genus of deciduous trees known as hackberries
- Prunus padus, a species of cherry tree

== Entomology ==
- a number of brush-footed butterflies in the genus Asterocampa:
  - Hackberry butterfly, Asterocampa celtis
  - Desert hackberry butterfly, Asterocampa leilia

== Places in the United States ==
- Hackberry, Arizona
- Hackberry, Louisiana
- Hackberry, Kansas
  - Hackberry High School, located in Hackberry, Louisiana
- Hackberry, Texas, in Denton County
- Hackberry (Lavaca County), Texas
- Hackberry Group, a geological formation in Iowa,
- Hackberry Group, a cluster of ruins in Hovenweep National Monument
- Hackberry Hill, Colorado
- Hackberry Mountain, California
- Hackberry School District, Arizona

== Other uses ==
- USS Hackberry (AN-25), a 1941 Aloe-class net laying ship
