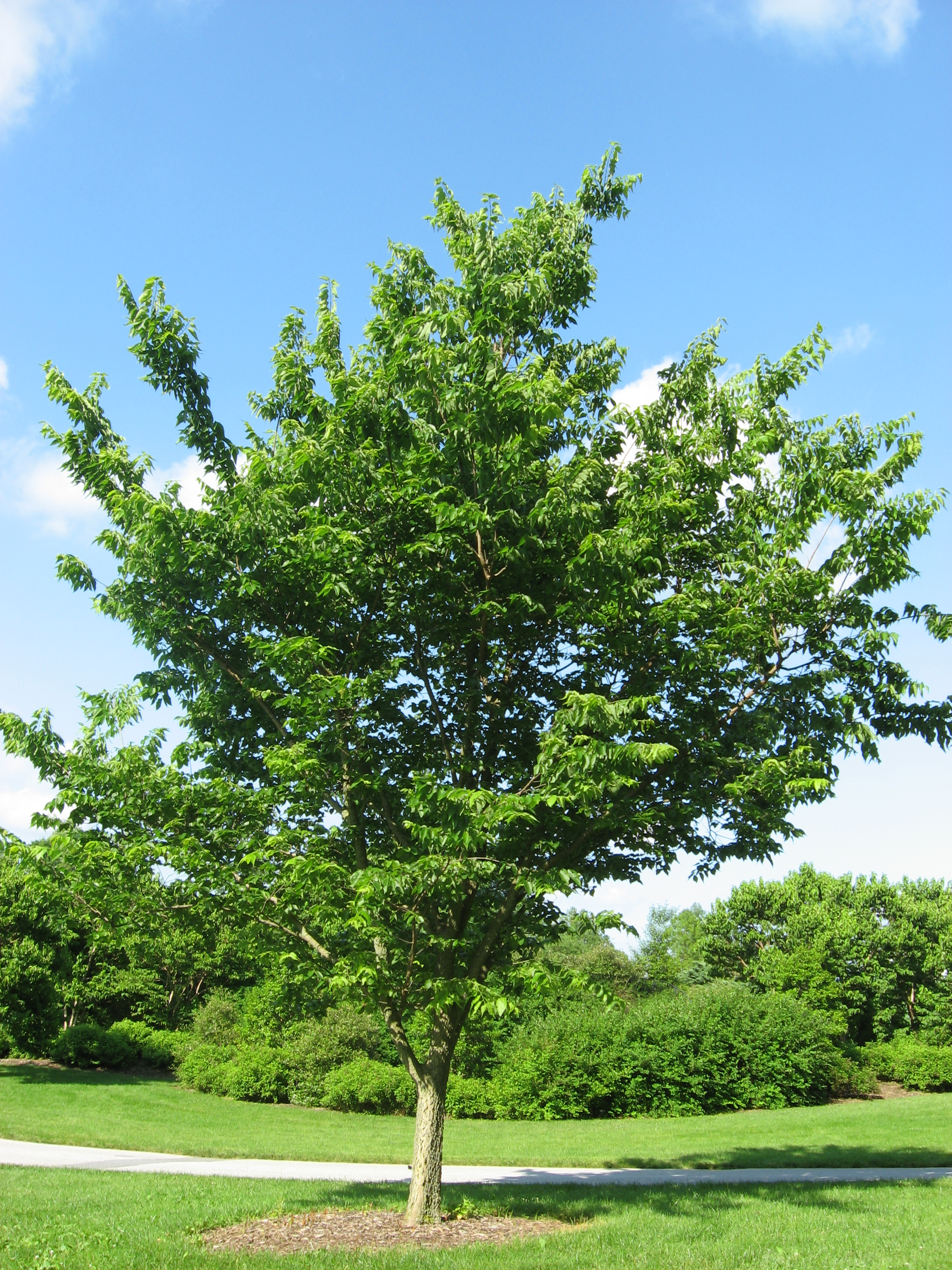

Conservation status
- Least Concern (IUCN 3.1)

- Secure (NatureServe)

Scientific classification
- Kingdom: Plantae
- Clade: Tracheophytes
- Clade: Angiosperms
- Clade: Eudicots
- Clade: Rosids
- Order: Rosales
- Family: Cannabaceae
- Genus: Celtis
- Species: C. occidentalis

Binomial name
- Celtis occidentalis L.
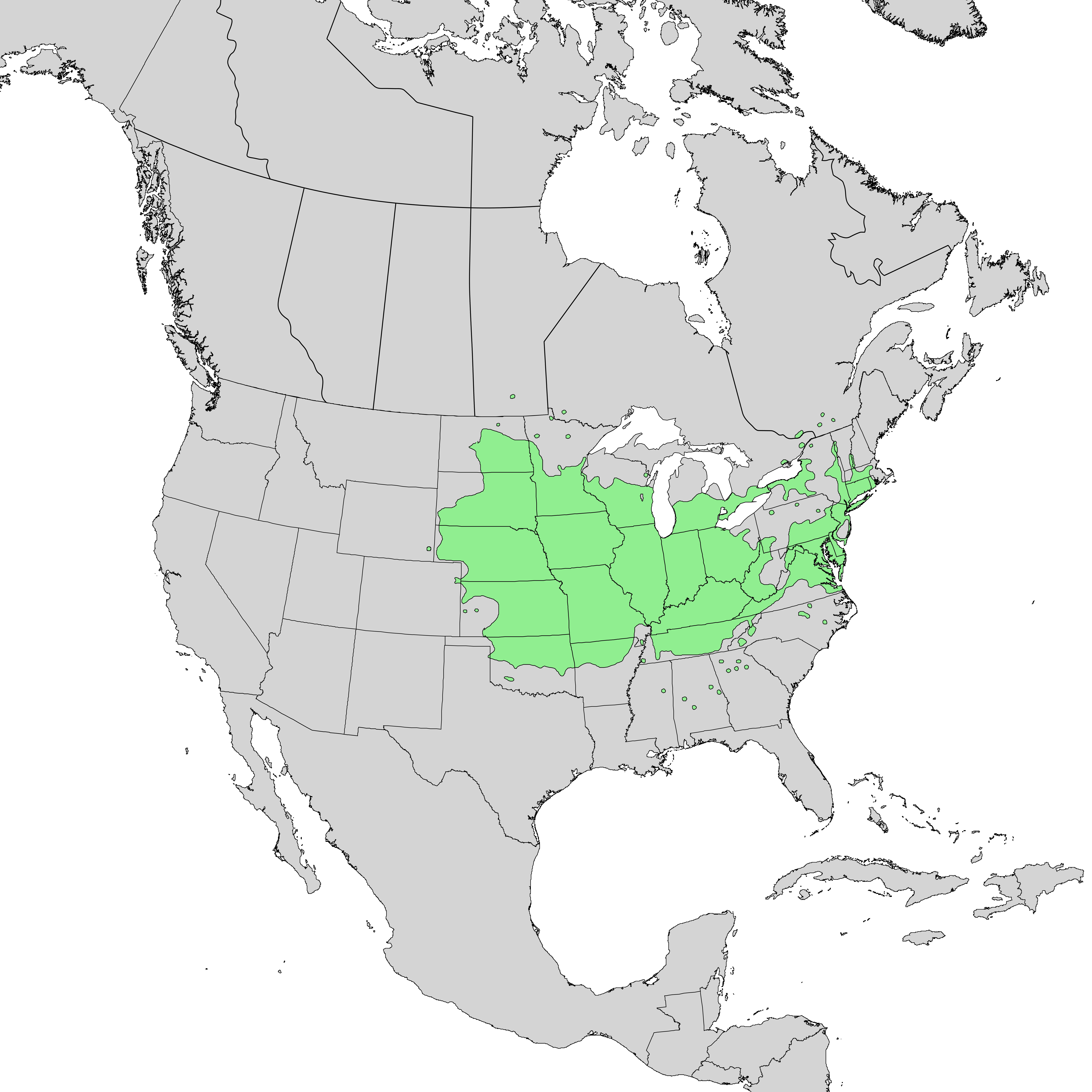
- Native range

= Celtis occidentalis =

Common hackberry

Species of tree

Celtis occidentalis, commonly known as the common hackberry, is a large deciduous tree native to North America. It is also known as the nettletree, beaverwood, northern hackberry, and American hackberry. It is a moderately long-lived hardwood, with a light-colored wood that is yellowish gray to light brown with yellow streaks.

The common hackberry is easily distinguished from elms and some other hackberries by its cork-like bark with wart-like protuberances. The leaves are distinctly asymmetrical and coarse-textured. It produces small fruits that turn orange-red to dark purple in the autumn, often staying on the trees for several months. The common hackberry is easily confused with the sugarberry (Celtis laevigata); these two are most easily distinguished by their range and habitat. The common hackberry also has wider leaves that are coarser above than the sugarberry.

== Description ==
The common hackberry is a medium-sized tree, 9 to 15 metres (30 to 50 ft) in height, with a slender trunk. In the best conditions in the southern Mississippi Valley area, it can grow to 40 m (130 ft). It has a handsome round-topped head and pendulous branches. It prefers rich moist soil, but will grow on gravelly or rocky hillsides. The roots are fibrous and it grows rapidly. In the western part of its range, trees may still grow up to 29 m (95 ft). The maximum age attained by hackberry is probably between 150 and 200 years in ideal conditions.

The bark is light brown or silvery gray, broken on the surface into thick appressed scales and sometimes roughened with excrescences; the pattern is very distinctive. The remarkable bark pattern is even more pronounced in younger trees, with the irregularly-spaced ridges resembling long geologic palisades of sedimentary [layered] rock formations when viewed edge-wise [cross-section]. Coins as large as U.S. quarters can easily be laid flat against the valleys, which may be as deep as an adult human finger.

The branchlets are slender, and their color transitions from light green to red brown and finally to dark red-brown. The winter buds are axillary, ovate, acute, somewhat flattened, one-fourth of an inch long, light brown. The bud scales enlarge with the growing shoot, and the innermost become stipules. No terminal bud is formed.

The leaves are alternately arranged on the branchlets, ovate to ovate-lanceolate, often slightly falcate, 5–12 cm (2–4 3/4 in) long by 3–9 cm (1 1/4–3 1/2 in), very oblique at the base, with a pointed tip. The margin is serrate (toothed), except at the base which is mostly entire (smooth). The leaf has three nerves, the midrib and primary veins prominent. The leaves come out of the bud conduplicate with slightly involute margins, pale yellow green, downy; when full grown are thin, bright green, rough above, paler green beneath. In autumn they turn to a light yellow. Petioles slender, slightly grooved, hairy. Stipules varying in form, caducous.

The flowers are greenish and appear in May, soon after the leaves. They are polygamo-monœcious, meaning that there are three kinds: staminate (male), pistillate (female), perfect (both female and male). They are borne on slender drooping pedicels.

The calyx is light yellow green, five-lobed, divided nearly to the base; lobes linear, acute, more or less cut at the apex, often tipped with hairs, imbricate in bud. There is no corolla.

There are five stamens, which are hypogynous; the filaments are white, smooth, slightly flattened and gradually narrowed from base to apex; in the bud incurved, bringing the anthers face to face, as flower opens they abruptly straighten; anthers extrorse, oblong, two-celled; cells opening longitudinally.

The pistil has a two-lobed style and one-celled superior ovary containing solitary ovules.

The fruit is a fleshy, oblong drupe, 1/4 to 3/8 in (0.64 to 0.95 cm) long, tipped with the remnants of style, dark purple when ripe. It is borne on a slender stem and ripens in September and October. It remains on the branches during winter. The endocarp contains significant amounts of biogenic carbonate that is nearly pure aragonite.

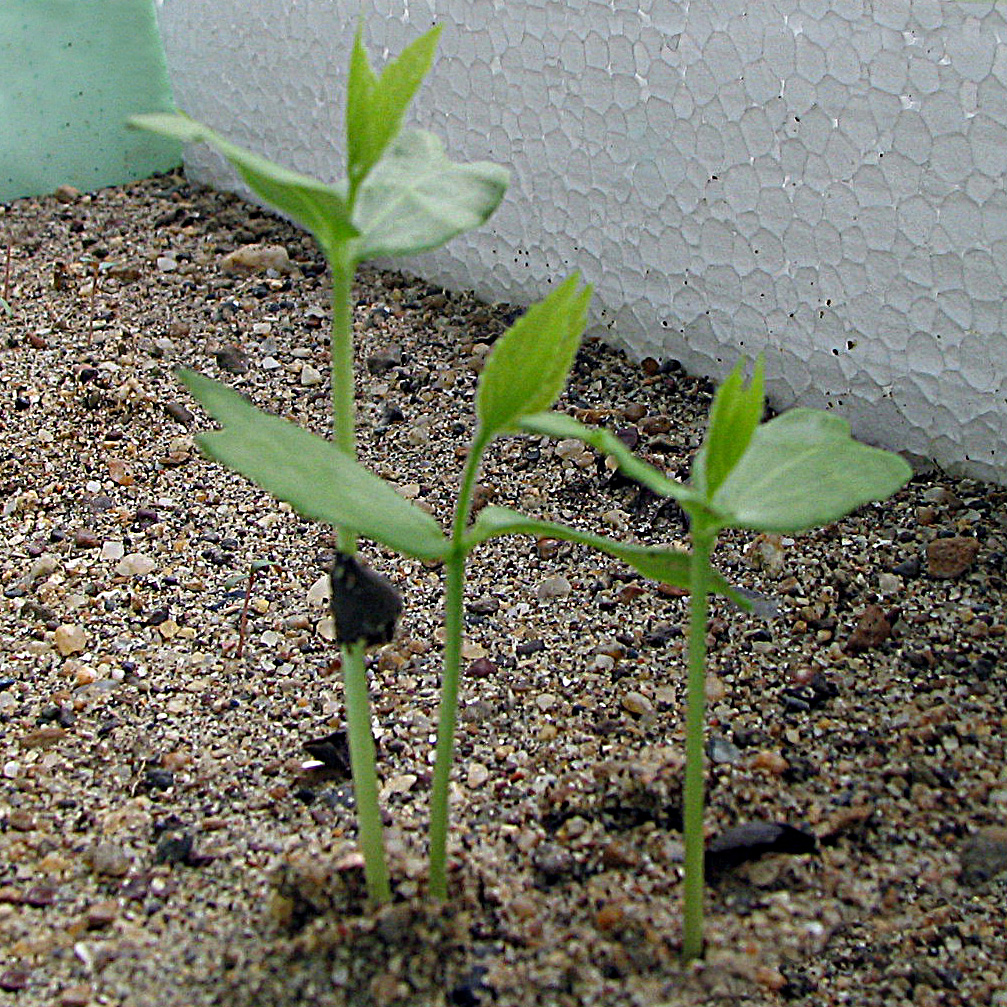
Seedlings

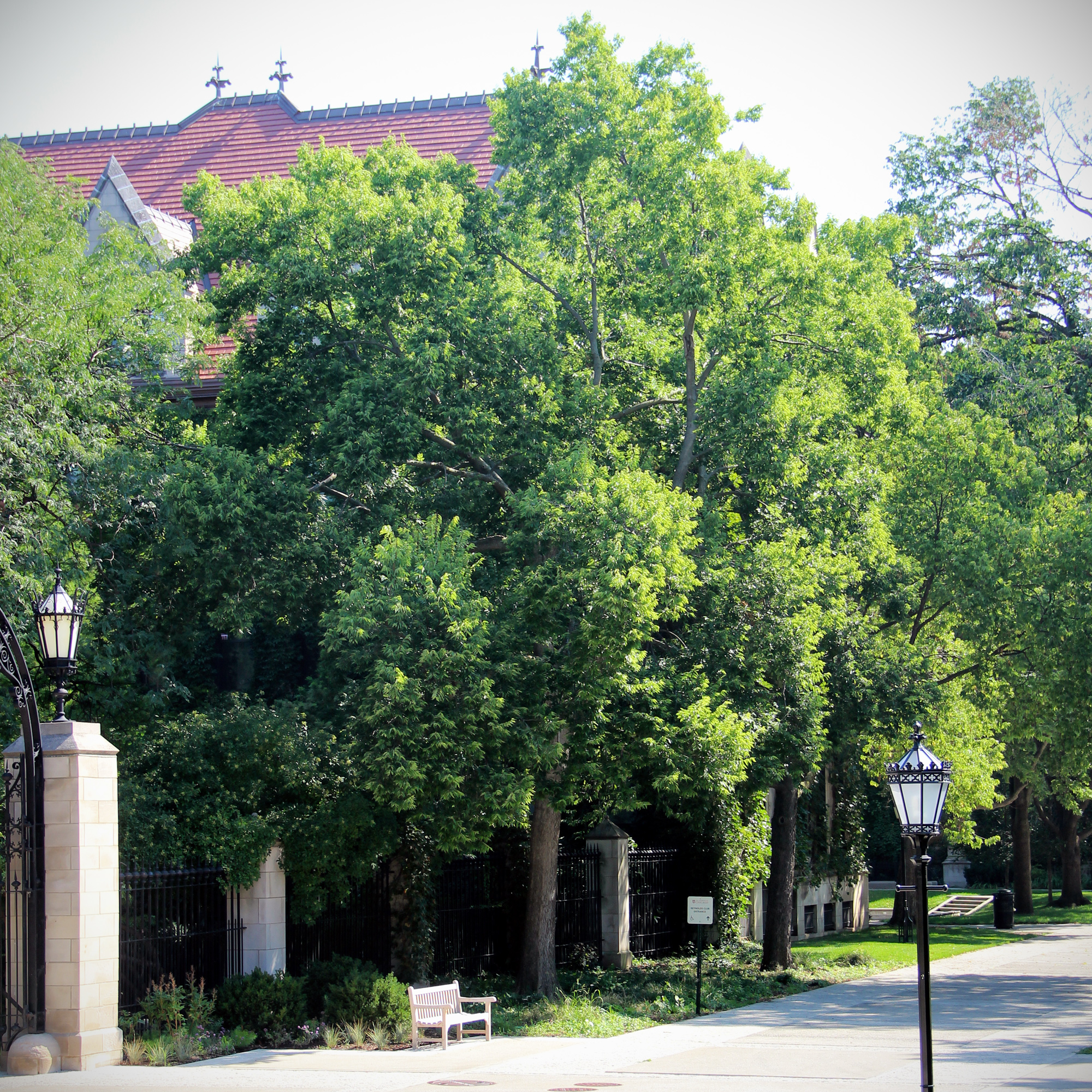
Tree at the University of Chicago

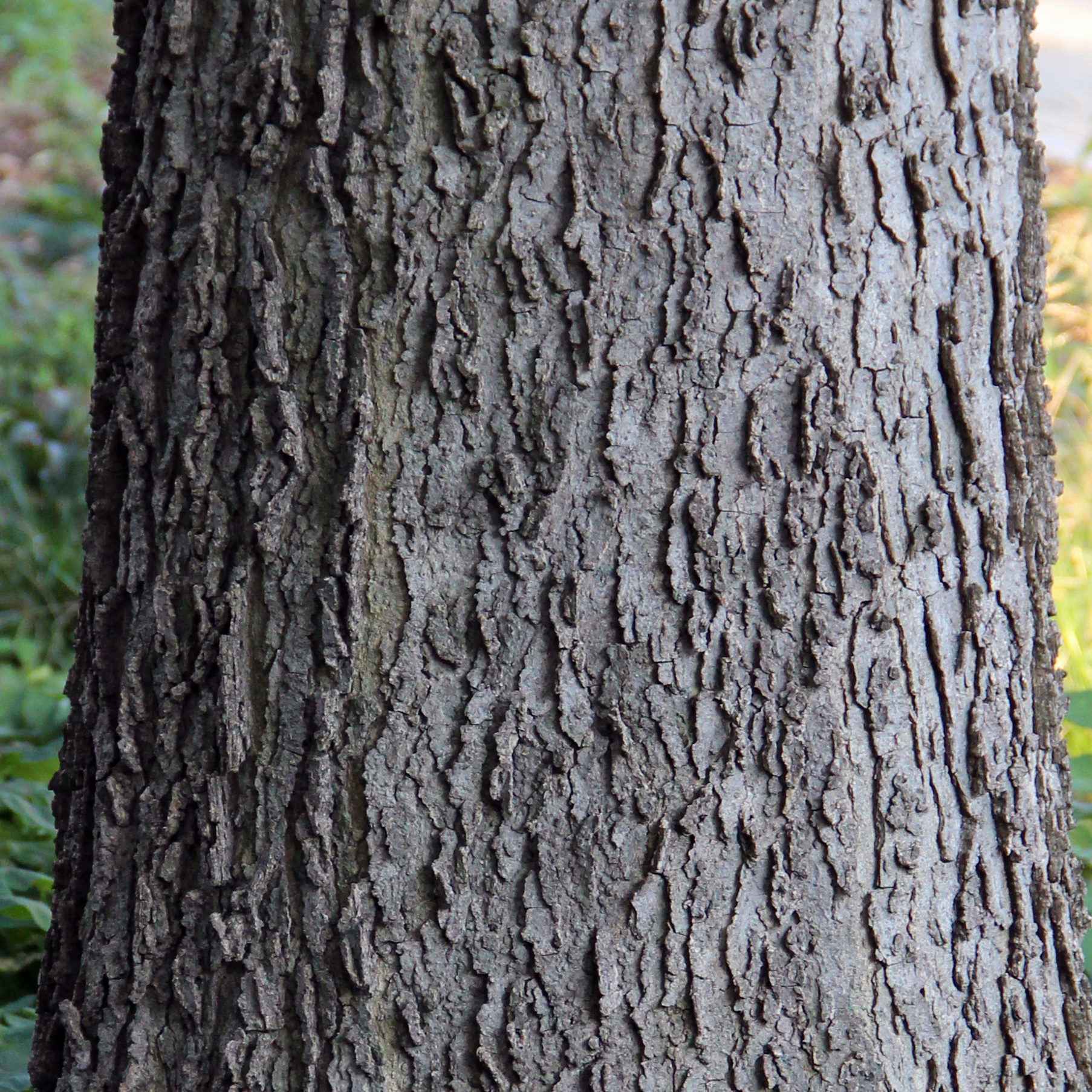
Tree bark, University of Chicago

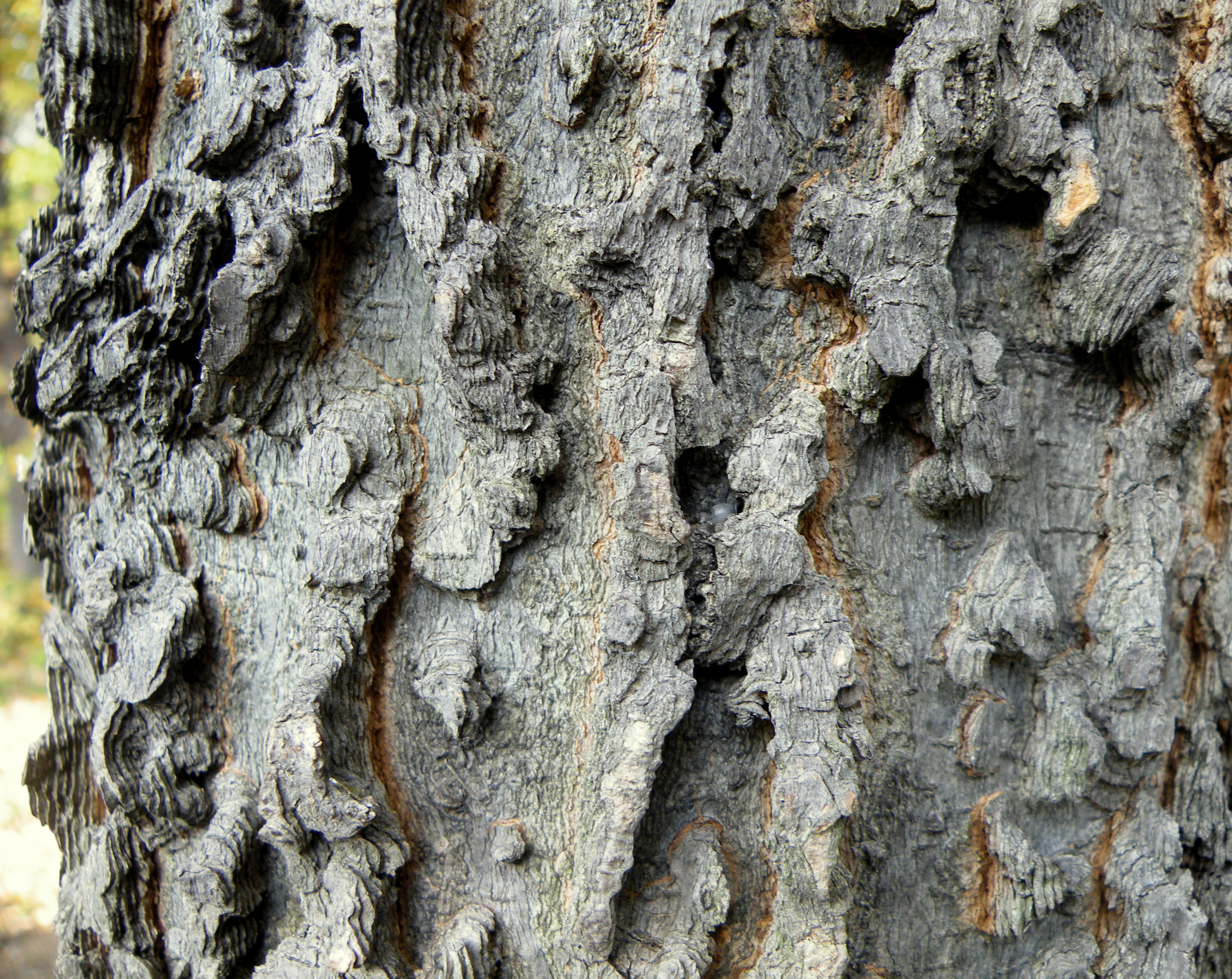
Ridges on bark, Jevremovac, Serbia

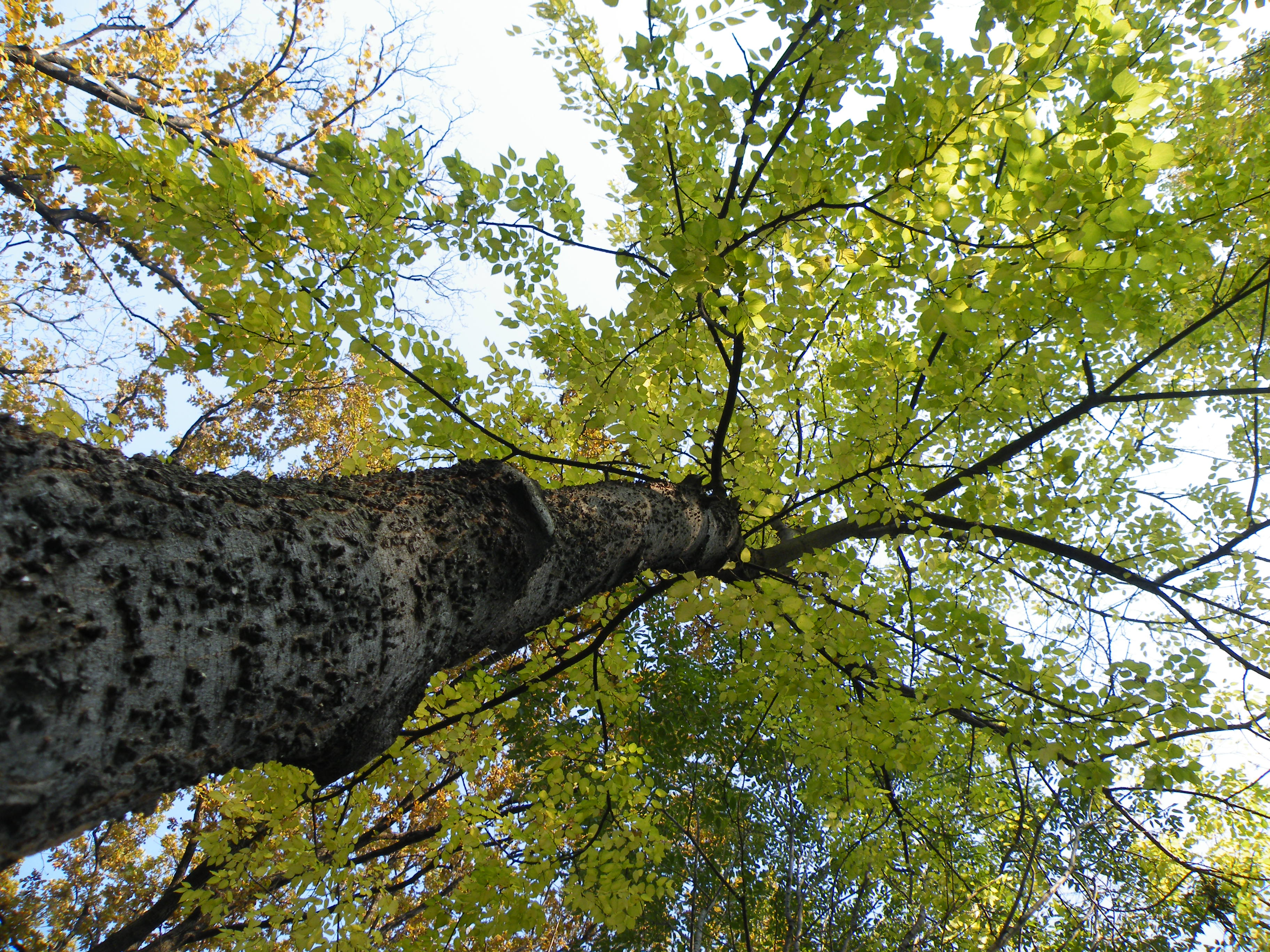
Canopy in autumn, Jevremonac

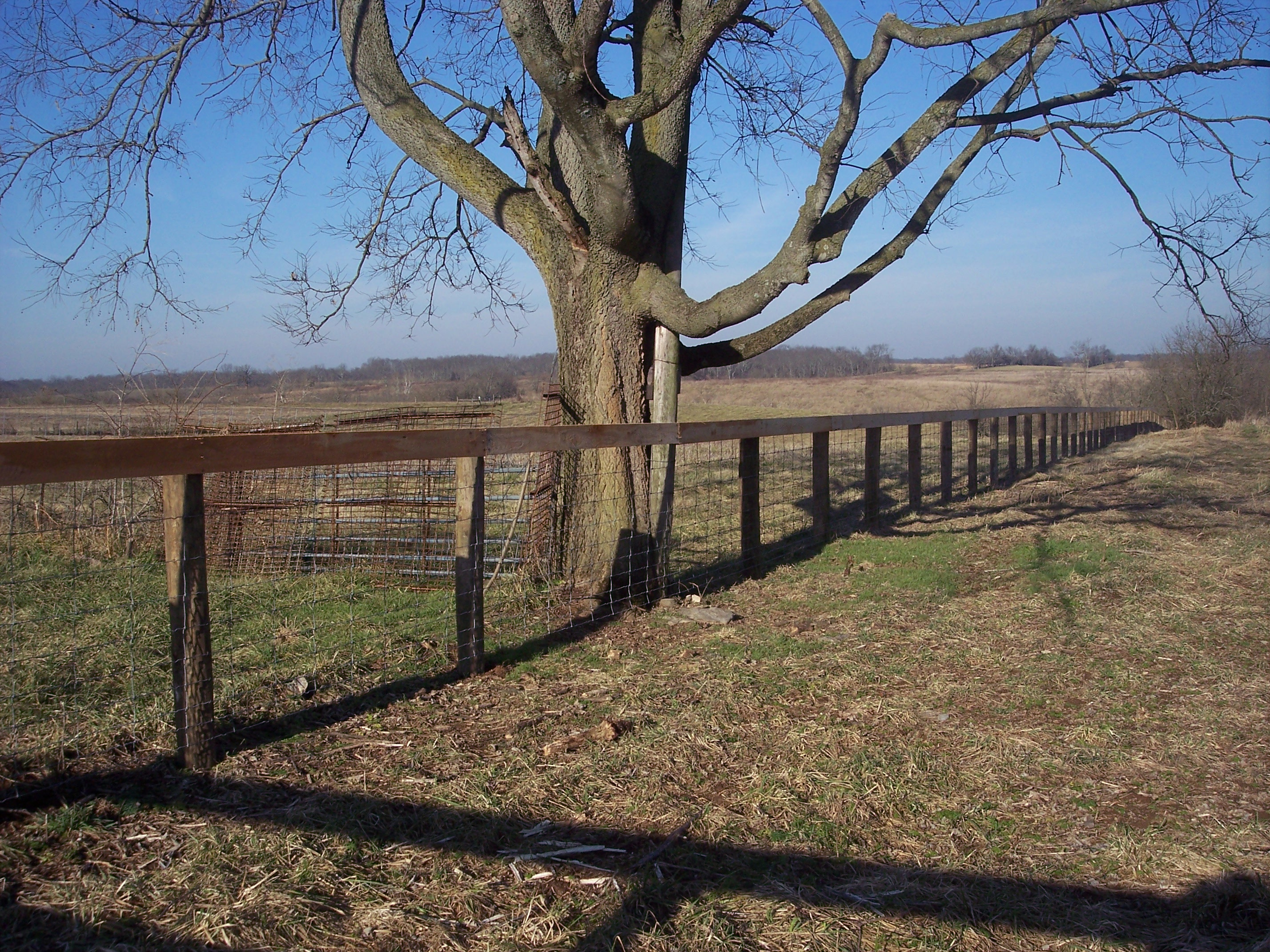
Mature tree in winter, Kentucky

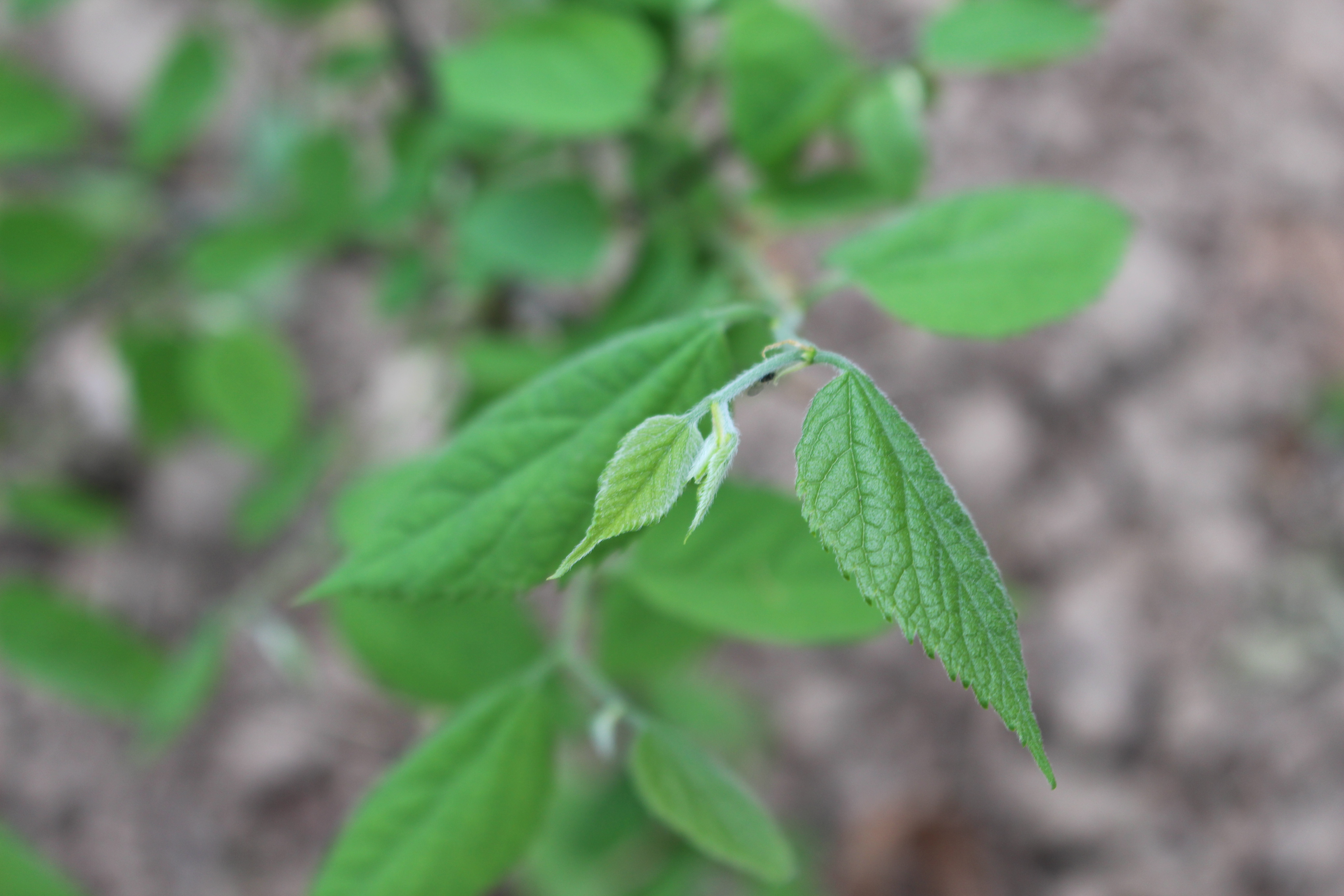
Young leaves are tomentous

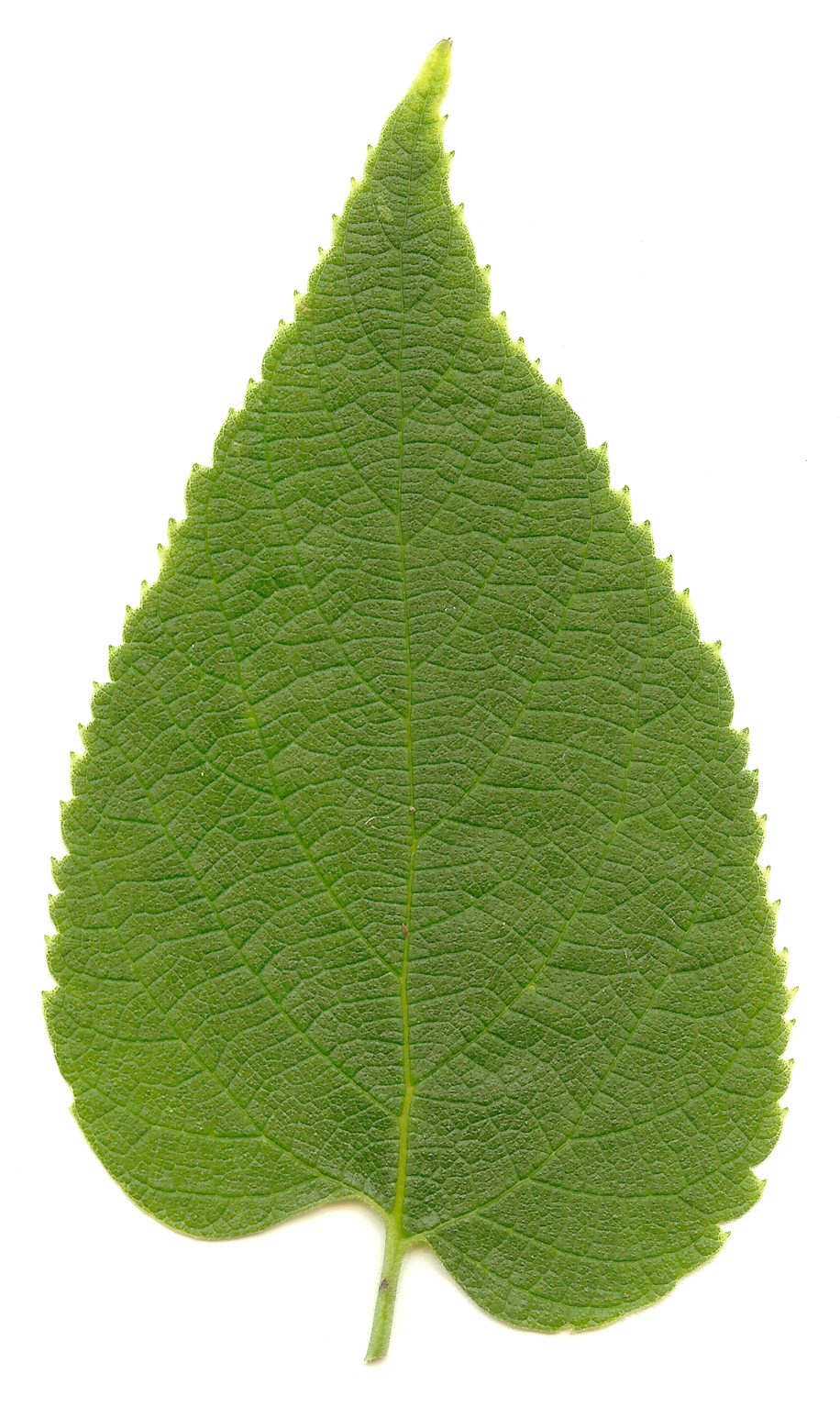
Leaf close-up

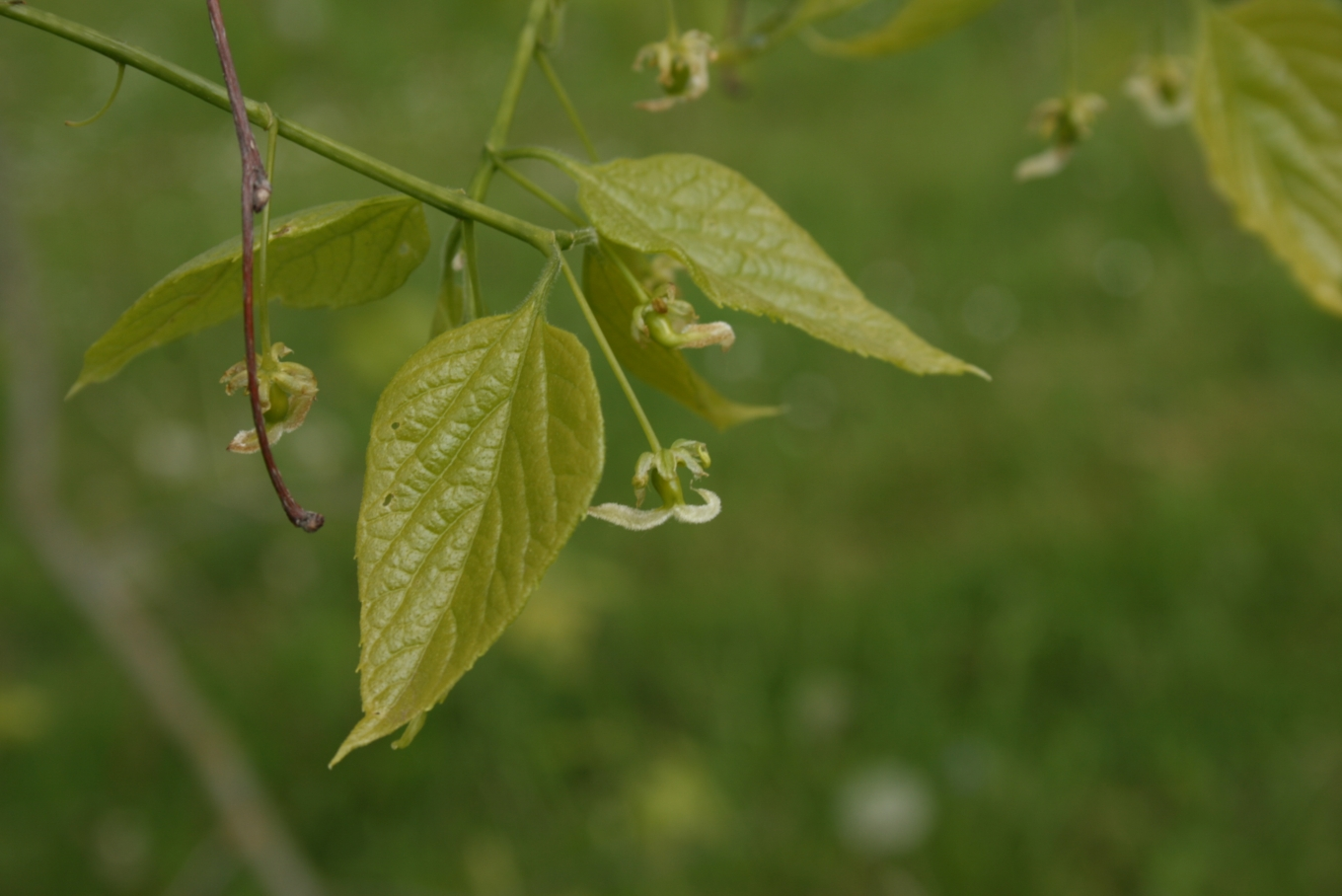
Leaves and flowers

== Distribution and habitat ==
The common hackberry is native to North America from southern Ontario and Quebec, through parts of New England, south to North Carolina-(Appalachia), west to northern Oklahoma, and north to North Dakota. There is a small isolated pocket at the southern end of Lake Manitoba. Hackberry's range overlaps with the sugarberry (Celtis laevigata), making it difficult to establish the exact range of either species in the South. Although there is little actual overlap, in the western part of its range the common hackberry is sometimes confused with the smaller netleaf hackberry (Celtis reticulata), which has a similar bark. Hackberry grows in many different habitats, although it prefers bottomlands and soils high in limestone. Its shade tolerance is greatly dependent on conditions. In favorable conditions its seedlings will persist under a closed canopy, but in less favorable conditions it can be considered shade intolerant.

== Ecology ==
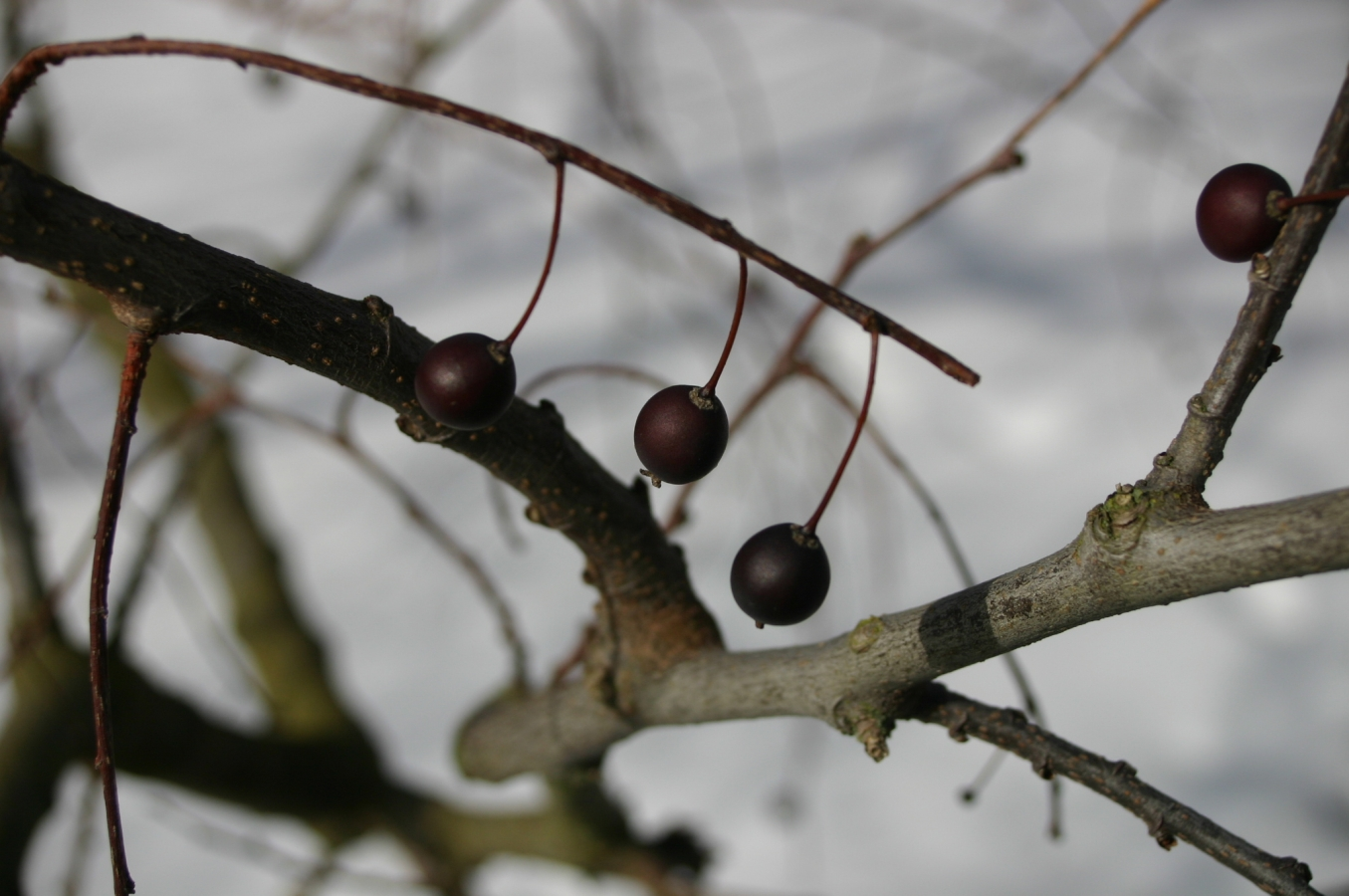
The fruits often hang on the tree through the winter.

The leaves are eaten by four gall-producing insects of the genus Pachypsylla, which do not cause serious damage to the tree. A number of insects and fungi cause rapid decay of dead branches or roots of the tree.

The small berries, hackberries, are eaten by a number of birds, including robins and cedar waxwings, and mammals. Most seeds are dispersed by animals, but some seeds are also dispersed by water.

The tree serves as a butterfly larval host, particularly the hackberry emperor and the tawny emperor.

=== Conservation ===
Celtis occidentalis was evaluated by NatureServe 16 August 2016. During that review they evaluated it as secure, G5, with a very low risk of extinction due to an extensive range and little or no concern due to declines.

== Cultivation and uses ==
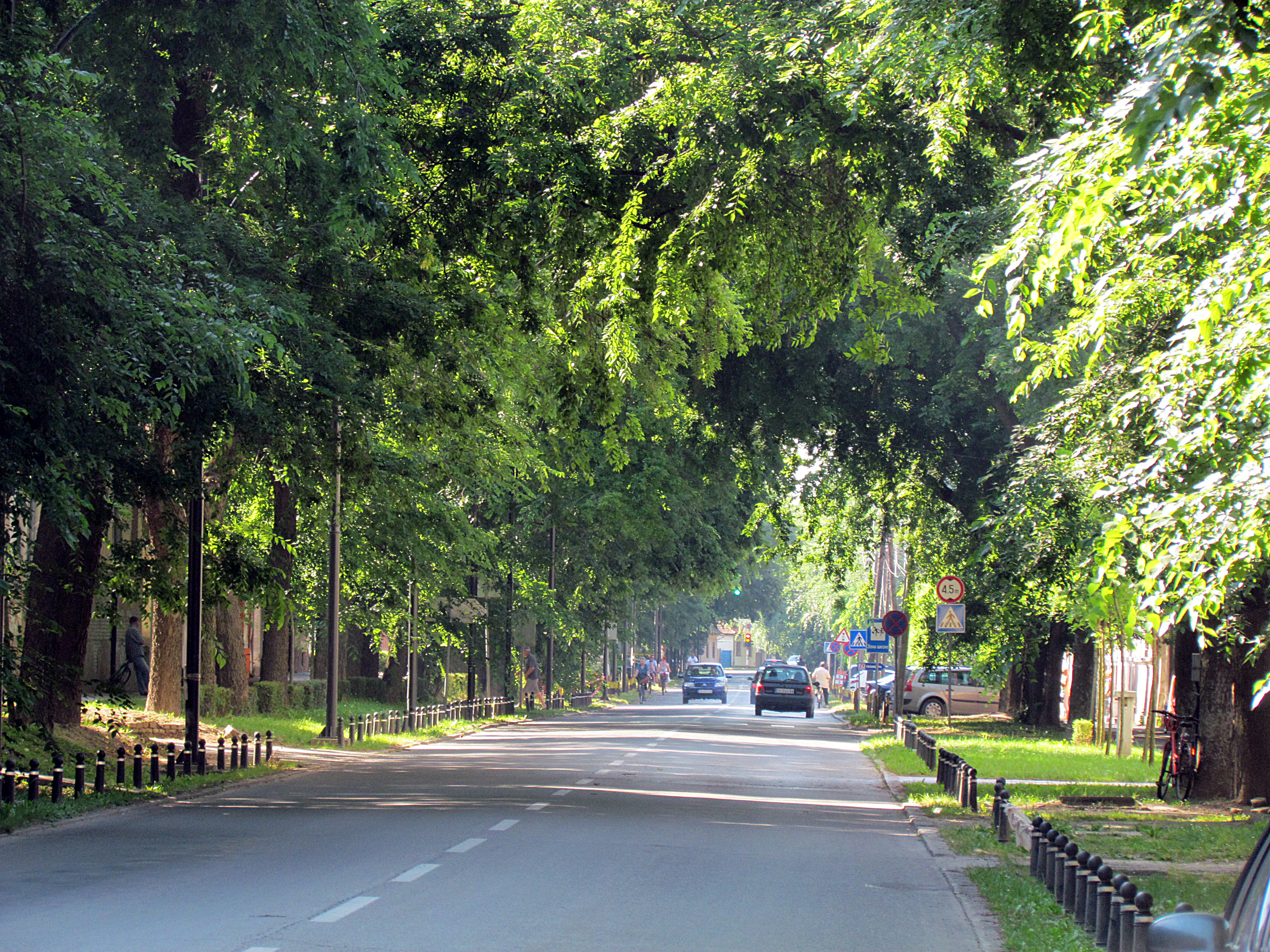
A streets with 'bođoš' in Sombor, Serbia

Hackberry's wood is light yellow; heavy, soft, coarse-grained, not strong. It rots easily, making the wood undesirable commercially, although it is occasionally used for fencing and cheap furniture.

Hackberry is only occasionally used as a street or landscape tree, although its tolerance for urban conditions makes it well suited to this role. Sombor in Serbia and Bratislava, the capital of Slovakia, are known for the extensive use of hackberry (in the latter case along with closely related but Eurasian Celtis australis) as a street tree. In Canada, the city of Montreal has over 10,000 Celtis occidentalis trees among its street trees.

The tree's pea-sized berries are edible, ripening in early September. Unlike most fruits, the berries are remarkably high in calories from fat, carbohydrate, and protein, and these calories are easily digestible without cooking or preparation. Omaha Native Americans ate the berries casually, while the Dakota used them as a flavor for meat, pounding them fine, seeds and all. The Pawnee also pounded the berries fine, added a little fat, and mixed them with parched corn.
