= Sordid emperor =

Sordid emperor is the common name of two species of brush-footed butterflies in the subfamily Apaturinae:

- Asterocampa idyja, native to North America
- Chitoria sordida, native to Southeast Asia
