= Mined Land Wildlife Area =

Park in the United States of America

Coordinates: 37.238°N 94.969°W

The Mined Land Wildlife Area is in southeastern Kansas. It consists of many different parcels of land formerly strip mined for coal and has a total area of 14,500 acres (5,900 ha). Mining took place from the late 19th century until the early 1970s. Strip mining left behind a landscape of deep trenches separated by ridges of overburden (excavated dirt and rock). Vegetation, mostly forest, has recovered naturally from the disruption of the surface. The Wildlife Area includes a maze of one thousand small, deep, elongated lakes which have filled former excavations. Fishing, hunting, camping and boating are popular recreations.

== Mining ==
Prior to the initiation of mining the land in what became Crawford and Cherokee counties, along with a small part of Labette County, was flat and about 90 percent was prairie with the remainder forest. White settlers moved into the region in the 1850s and surface mining of coal began soon afterwards. Engine-powered mining began in 1877 and the two counties became the largest coal producing sites in Kansas. Coal production peaked about 1915; 9,000 persons were employed in Crawford Country alone by coal mining companies. The two counties reached their maximum populations in 1920.

"Big Brutus", an electric power shovel, was the second largest of its type in the United States in the 1960s. Note the size of the automobiles near its base.

Coal mining companies abandoned the land after it had been mined leaving a barren, convoluted, and polluted environment behind. Kansas passed laws requiring reclamation of mined land in 1967. In 1977, federal laws requiring reclamation came into effect. Those laws had little impact on southeastern Kansas as most coal mining had ceased by that time. The total area of land disturbed by strip mining in Crawford and Cherokee Counties is 44,315 acres (17,934 ha), about six percent of the total acreage of the two counties. Little of this land has been reclaimed as the mining took place before legislation requiring reclamation. Vegetation on the unreclaimed land recovered over a period of 50 to more than 100 years and some became the recreational land of the present-day Wildlife Area.

Mining proved an economic boon to the region, but over the long run the negative impacts became apparent. In 1930, coal companies valued mined land at ten dollars per acre as compared with un-mined agricultural land valued at 25 to 30 dollars per acre. The tax base of the counties declined as reduced mining operations left "wasteland" behind. As late as 1997, mined land could be purchased for 50 dollars per acre, less than one-tenth the value of farmland in the region. Mined land was regarded as unsuitable for dwellings and farming.

== Wildlife Area ==
The Mined Land Wildlife Area was assembled mostly by donations of land depleted of coal by mining companies. The first donation was in 1926 and the largest was 8,208 acres (3,322 ha) in 1981.

The Wildlife Area is in a belt of land about thirty miles in length reaching from Oswego in the southwest to the border with Missouri north of Pittsburg. The Wildlife Area consists of 46 parcels of land, called units, totalling in acreage 14,500 acres (5,900 ha) (22 sq miles). One thousand lakes with a total acreage of 1,500 acres (610 ha) criss-cross the refuge. The lakes range in size from one-quarter acre to 50 acres. They are mostly canal-like, steep-sided, straight, long, and narrow, rarely more than 200 ft (61 m) wide and sometimes longer than one mile and up to 60 ft (18 m) deep. The lakes are former trenches dug by power shovel to reach veins of coal. The lakes are bordered and separated by low ridges of soil and rock extracted by digging. Six of the lakes in the Wildlife Area have the clearest water of any lakes in Kansas as measured by the Secchi depth.

Vegetation has come back since mining ceased. About 4,000 acres (1,600 ha) of the Wildlife Area is carpeted with native grasses. The remainer is covered by forests of bur oak, pin oak, walnut, hickory, and hackberry. Animal life includes whitetail deer, turkey, mourning dove, cottontail rabbits, and fox squirrels. Bald eagles are seen in the winter and watefowl are abundant. Hunting is popular and small, motorized boats are permitted during hunting seasons.

Fishing is a major activity of the 300,000 people who visit the Wildlife Area each year. Two hundred lakes have been stocked with largemouth bass, channel catfish, crappie, and sunfish. Introduced non-native species include walleye and rainbow trout. Unusual for Kansas, trout survive year round in the deep, cool waters of one large lake in Unit 30 of the Wildlife Area. Small, motorized boats are allowed for fishing. Many fishing lakes have concrete or gravel boat-launching ramps. Primitive camping is permitted.
