= Hackberries =

Hackberries is a common name for

- the deciduous trees in the genus Celtis
- some of the butterflies in the genus Asterocampa
