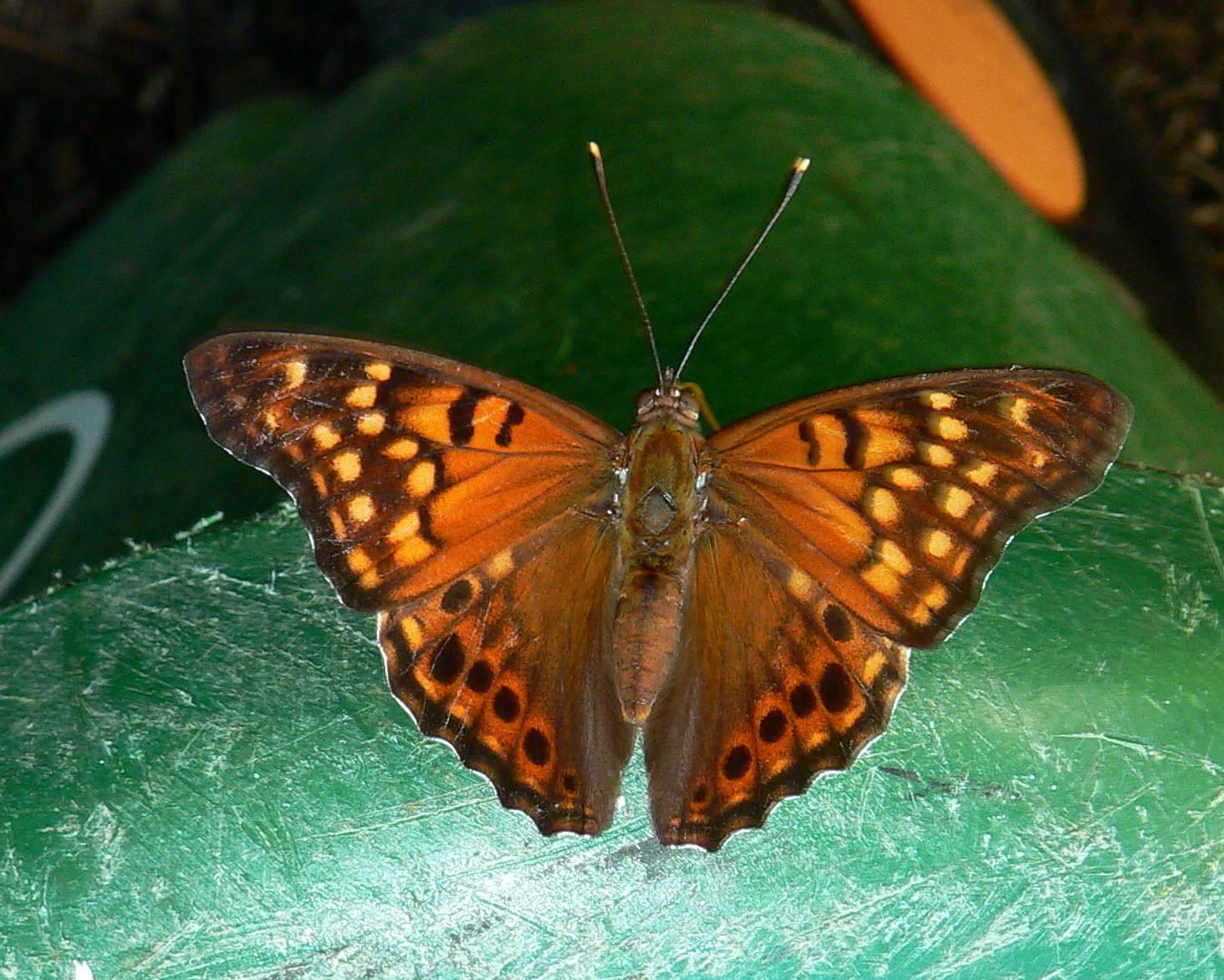
- Dorsal view
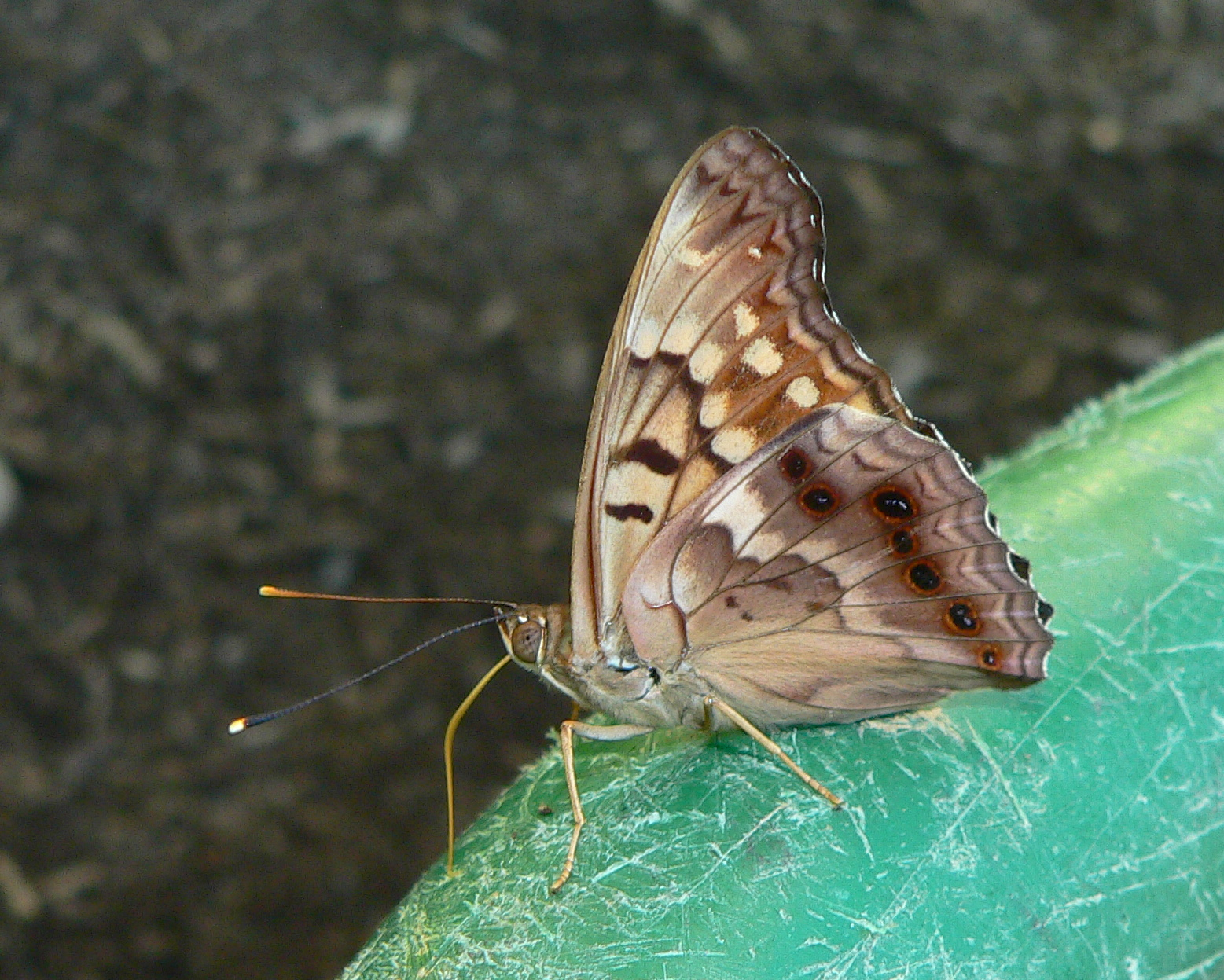
- Ventral view

Conservation status
- Secure (NatureServe)

Scientific classification
- Kingdom: Animalia
- Phylum: Arthropoda
- Class: Insecta
- Order: Lepidoptera
- Family: Nymphalidae
- Genus: Asterocampa
- Species: A. clyton

Binomial name
- Asterocampa clyton (Boisduval & Leconte, 1835)
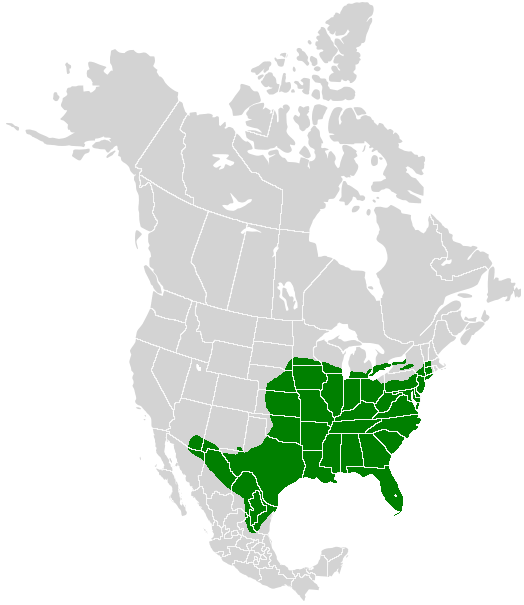

= Asterocampa clyton =

Species of butterfly

Asterocampa clyton, the tawny emperor, is a species of brush-footed butterfly. It is native to North America, especially the eastern half from Canada to northern Mexico. The tawny emperor should not be mistaken for a very similar Asterocampa butterfly, the hackberry emperor, which can be distinguished by the white spots near the tip of its forewing and the black eyespot lower along the edge of the forewing.

The upperside is mostly dark brown. The forewing is an orange-brown color with pale orange-yellow spots. The underside is mainly gray brown with the forewing having some black and pale yellowish markings. The wingspan measures 2 to 2.6 inches (51 to 66 mm). A dark morph of this species is regionally common with nearly uniformly dark hind wings.

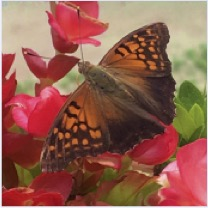

This butterfly may be seen flying near houses, gravel driveways, near water, muddy places, gardens, and woodlands. Its only host plant is hackberry trees. The adult feeds on carrion, plant sap, and dung, and rarely land on flowers.

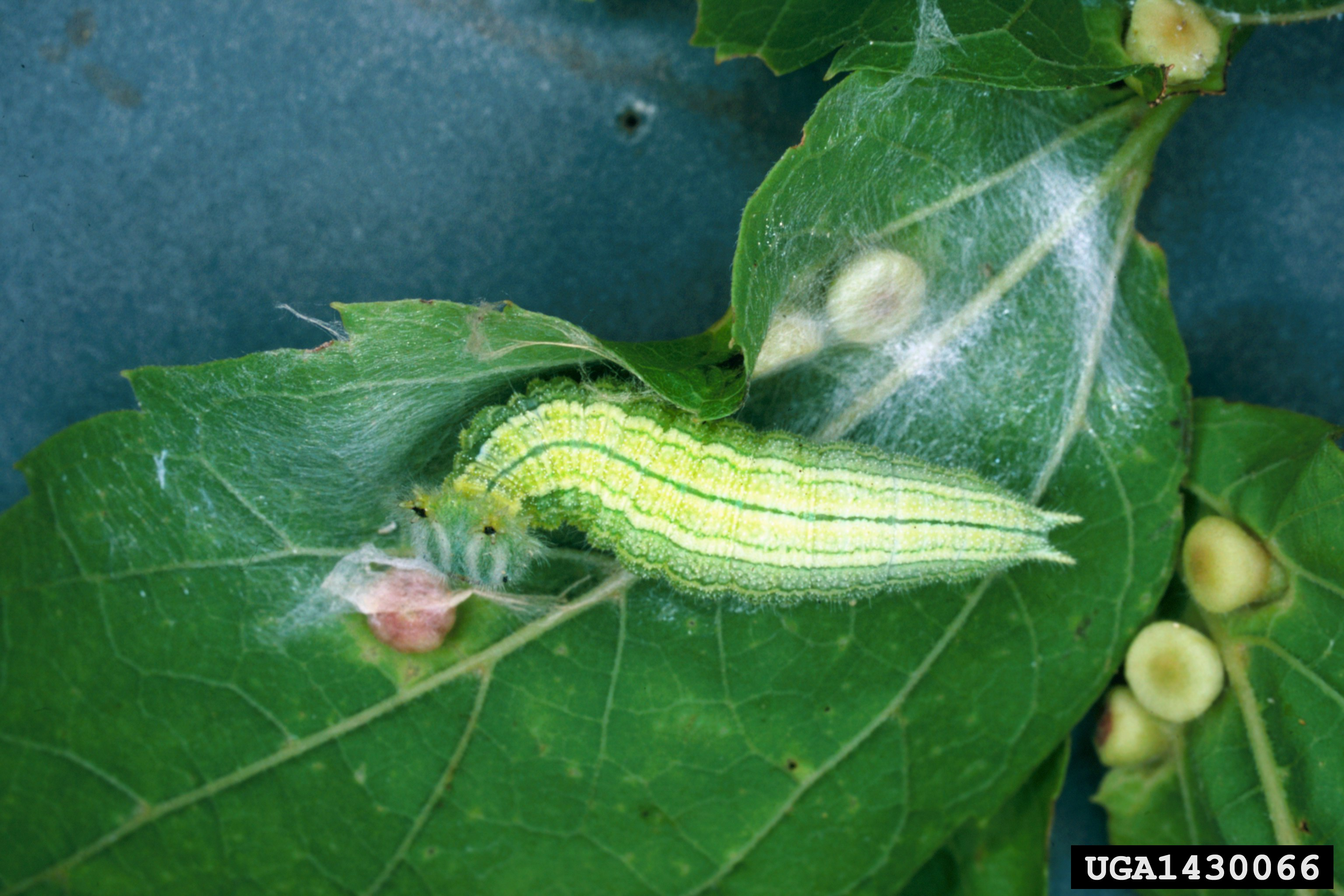
Caterpillar

The female lays clusters of green eggs. The larva is green with yellow, white, or greenish stripes.
