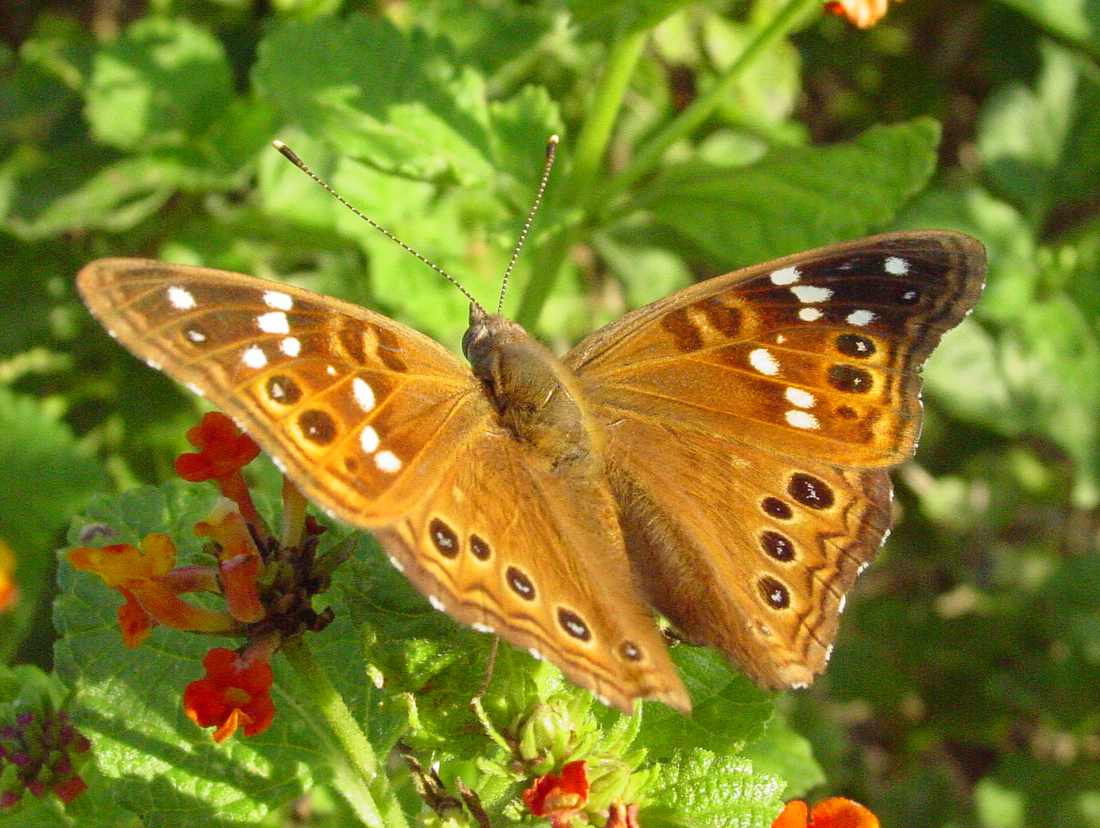
- upperside
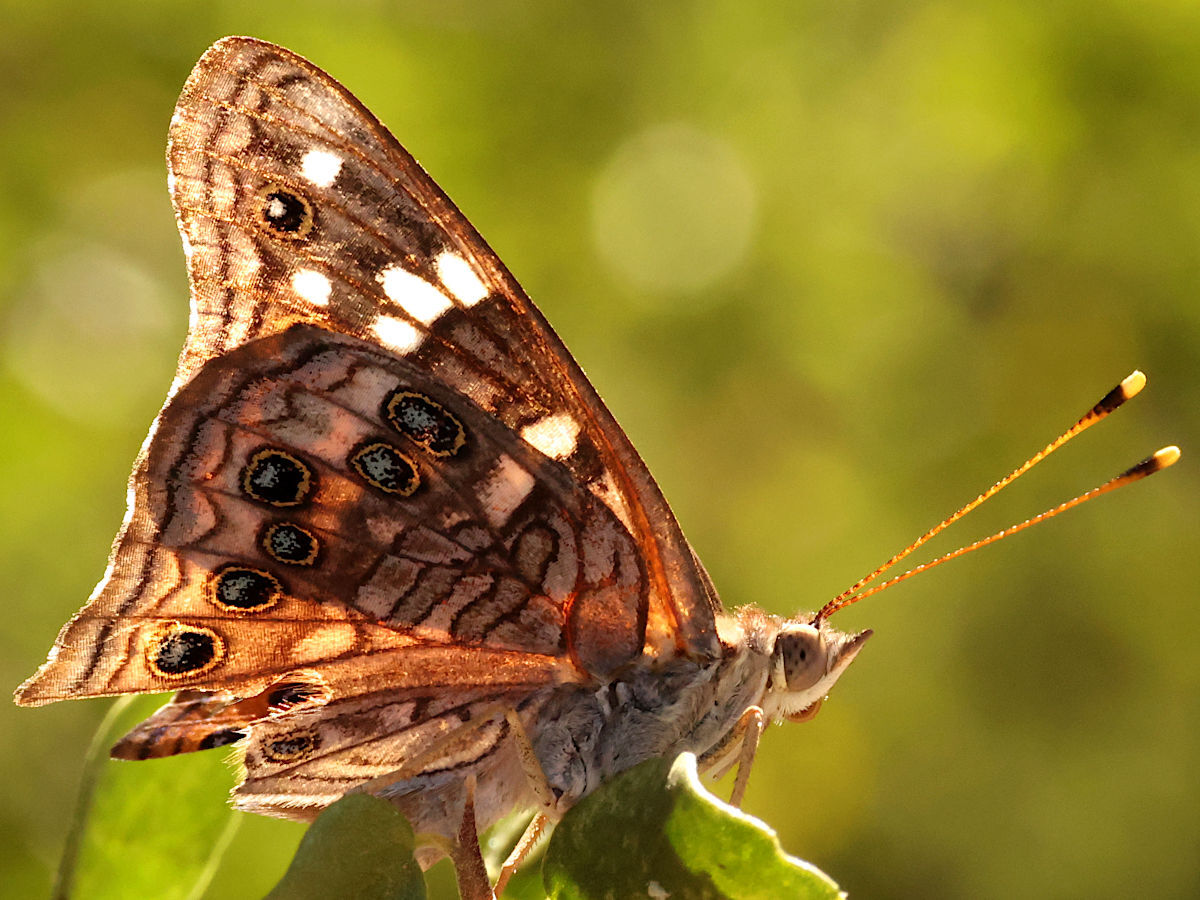
- underside

Scientific classification
- Domain: Eukaryota
- Kingdom: Animalia
- Phylum: Arthropoda
- Class: Insecta
- Order: Lepidoptera
- Family: Nymphalidae
- Genus: Asterocampa
- Species: A. leilia

Binomial name
- Asterocampa leilia W.H. Edwards, 1874

Synonyms
- Apatura leilia W.H. Edwards, 1874; Apatura cocles W.H. Edwards, 1884; Apatura cocles Lintner, [1885]

= Asterocampa leilia =

Species of butterfly

Asterocampa leilia, the Empress Leilia, Leilia hackberry butterfly or desert hackberry, is a species of butterfly in the family Nymphalidae.

== Description ==
Adults are brownish orange, with white and black spots on the bottom of the wings. The length of the wings is 1.5 to 2 inches (38 to 51 mm).

== Distribution ==
The species can be found in the south-western United States, including Arizona and Texas, as well as Mexico.

== Ecology and habitat ==
Adults feed on dung, sap and rotten fruit. In very rare cases the species will feed on nectar. They live in canyons, streamsides, thorn scrubs, and washes. Males of the species will wait near their food plants for females to appear. Larvae feed on hackberry.
