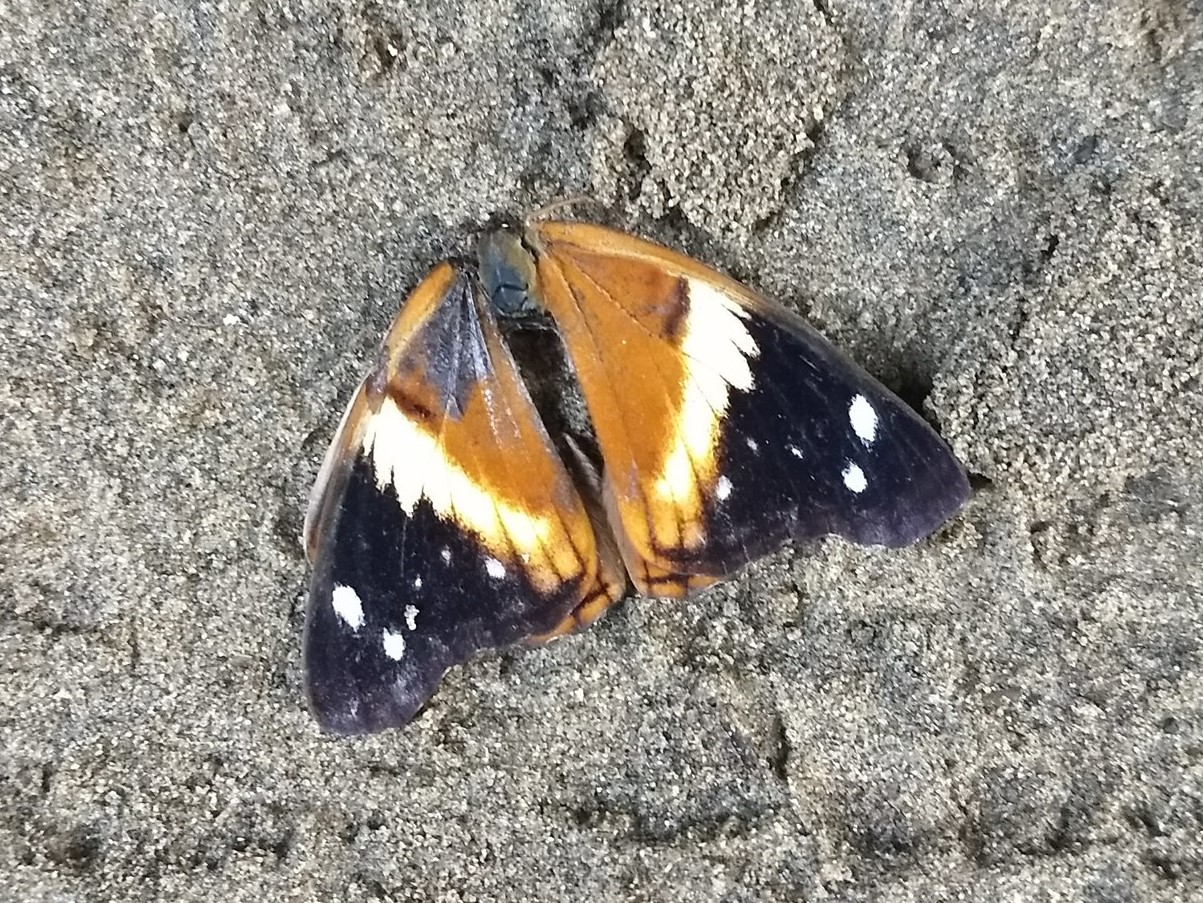

Scientific classification
- Domain: Eukaryota
- Kingdom: Animalia
- Phylum: Arthropoda
- Class: Insecta
- Order: Lepidoptera
- Family: Nymphalidae
- Genus: Asterocampa
- Species: A. idyja

Binomial name
- Asterocampa idyja (Geyer, 1828)

Synonyms
- Doxocopa idyja Geyer, [1828]; Papilio herse Fabricius, 1793; Doxocopa idyja padola Fruhstorfer, 1912; Apatura argus Bates, 1864; Doxocopa argus f. armilla Fruhstorfer, 1912

= Asterocampa idyja =

Cream-banded emperor

Species of butterfly

Asterocampa idyja, the cream-banded emperor, is a species of butterfly in the family Nymphalidae.

== Description ==
The upperside of the wings is brown in both sexes. The male forewing has white spots near the tip, and some yellow spots across the wing's center. The hindwing of the males has six dark eyespots that are submarginal. Females have much darker spots, which are more diffuse. Their forewing is not as hooked, and much broader than in males.

== Ecology ==
Adults are on wing in October.

== Distribution ==
The species can be found in Cuba, Guatemala, the Isle of Pines and Mexico. They rarely appear on Hispaniola and Puerto Rico.

== Subspecies ==
- Asterocampa idyja idyja (Cuba, Haiti, Puerto Rico) - dusky emperor
- Asterocampa idyja argus (Bates, 1864) (Mexico, Guatemala, Honduras, Nicaragua, Belize) - banded emperor
