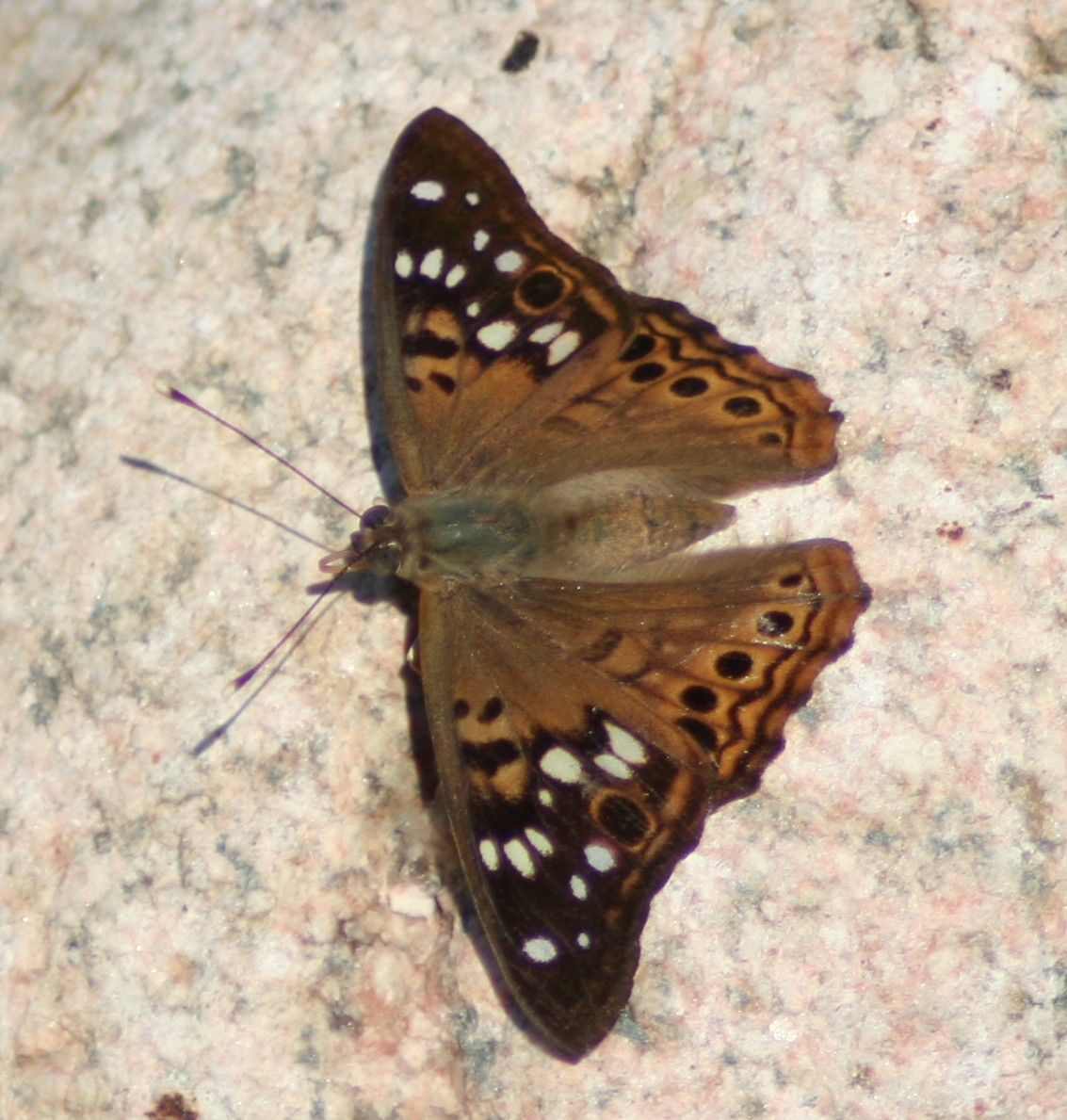

Conservation status
- Secure (NatureServe)

Scientific classification
- Kingdom: Animalia
- Phylum: Arthropoda
- Clade: Pancrustacea
- Class: Insecta
- Order: Lepidoptera
- Family: Nymphalidae
- Genus: Asterocampa
- Species: A. celtis

Binomial name
- Asterocampa celtis (Boisduval & Leconte, 1835)
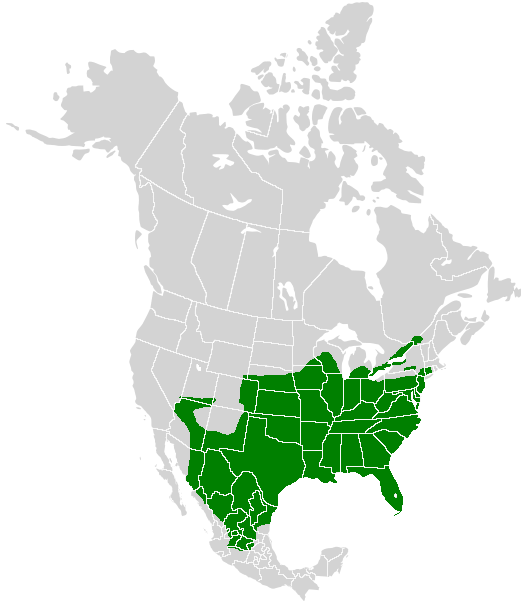

= Asterocampa celtis =

Hackberry emperor

Species of butterfly

Asterocampa celtis, the hackberry emperor, is a North American butterfly that belongs to the brushfooted butterfly family, Nymphalidae. It gets its name from the hackberry tree (Celtis occidentalis and others in the genus Celtis) upon which it lays its eggs. The hackberry tree is the only host plant for A. celtis and is the food source for larvae.

The hackberry emperor is known for being a quick, mercurial butterfly. It often is found along water sources and lowlands, although it lives in a broad range of habitats. Another notable characteristic is that it rarely is spotted visiting a flower, which is considered unusual for a butterfly.

Species in the genus Asterocampa are regarded as being "cheater" organisms, since these butterflies do not pollinate flowers when they feed from them. This species can more accurately be described as parasitizing their hosts and plant food sources since they extract nutrients without providing any benefits to the host.

As a member of the family Nymphalidae, the hackberry emperor oviposits its eggs in clutches, or clusters, upon hackberry leaves. There are a few plausible evolutionary reasons for this behavior, but the exact cause for this species' behavior is in contention. Possible explanations include higher fecundity that may be aided by aposematic coloration.

== Geographic range ==
The hackberry emperor is found across a wide range within North America. It has been observed as far south as central Mexico and north into parts of Eastern Canada. Its range extends to the southwest into regions like Arizona, New Mexico, and other parts of the Rockies, as shown by the map. It can commonly be found across the Midwest and especially along the east coast from Florida up to New England.

== Habitat ==
Asterocampa celtis lives wherever the hackberry tree lives. There are a variety of species of the hackberry line, and A. celtis is not found preferentially on any one kind of hackberry. More specifically, the butterfly lives in cities, forests, and wooded areas, and especially prefers areas near rivers or other bodies of water. The species is not very deterred by human development. Furthermore, the hackberry emperor may be seen near woodland edges, near creeks, around buildings, and around damp, muddy areas.

== Food resources ==
=== Caterpillar ===
The larvae of A. celtis feed upon the leaves and leaf buds of hackberry trees. They must first climb back up their host tree to eat after they are done hibernating over winter. The caterpillars have been known to eat so much at a time that they can completely defoliate a tree.

=== Adults ===
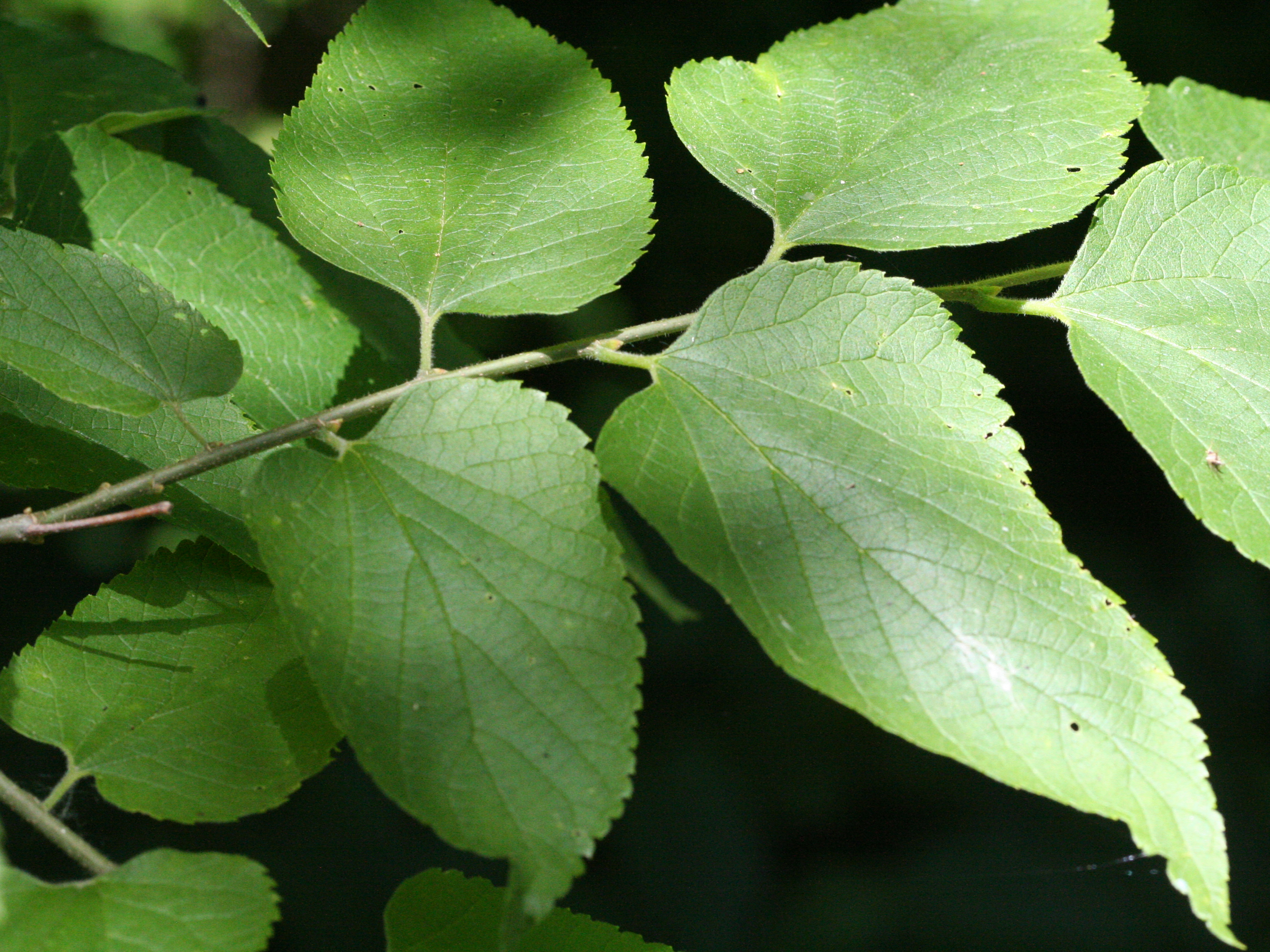
Leaves of a hackberry tree

Adults feed on a variety of food sources. They seldom make visitations to flowers so nectar is not a primary food source. Instead, they commonly eat hackberry sap, feces, dead animals including decaying pigs, snakes, and dogs, and old fruit. They drink from water in puddles. Also, they are known to land on humans to lick off their sweat to gain sodium.

== Parental care ==
=== Oviposition ===
A. celtis usually lays eggs in clusters on the underside of hackberry leaves, although it has been observed to occasionally lay eggs on the top of a leaf. Laying eggs in clusters results in higher fecundity for the female. Some factors influencing oviposition could be that laying eggs in a large cluster decreases the time and energy necessary for searching for new leaf sites, which decrease the risk of maternal death between oviposition events. For A. celtis, laying eggs in clusters is its best strategy to produce the most offspring.

== Life history ==
=== Egg ===
The pale eggs are laid in clusters of 5-20 eggs on the host plant. Eggs look white with a faint green-yellow hue.

=== Larva ===
The body is approximately 1.4" long. The head has brown-black colored dorsal horns. The body is a primarily green with whitish-yellow chalazae, or bumps. At the rear, two sharp tails protrude outwards level with the abdomen.

Half-grown larvae hibernate over the winter in fallen hackberry leaves along the forest floor. In the spring, they emerge again and climb back up the hackberry tree to eat the foliage.

=== Pupa ===
Pupae have a dark green color with white spots all around the body. There are also white lines going diagonally across the abdomen.

Pupae are found on the underside of hackberry leaves and metamorphose into adults in the early summer.

=== Adult ===
A. celtis adults exhibit sexual dimorphism. Males have smaller, darker bodies and more slender wings than females. Both males and females are light brown with a row of black or white dots near the far edge of their wings. White spots near the front of the wing help distinguish it from a similar butterfly, the Tawny Emperor.

Adult hackberry emperors lay two broods in a year. This production of multiple generations within one year makes it such that all life stages may be present at one time within a single site or host tree.

== Parasitism ==
A. celtis visits flowers in an unusual way. On the rare occasion that the butterfly visits flowers for feeding, it does not allow its feet or its antennae to touch the flower. Only the proboscis is used to touch parts of the flower, which suggests that the butterfly would be an ineffective pollinator. This is considered to be "cheater" behavior. Typically, the specialized relationship of flowering plants and butterflies results in mutual benefit, in that the butterfly gains nutrients from flower visits while the host plant gains reproductive fitness from assistance in pollination. However, the hackberry emperor likely does not aid in pollination in any significant way.

== Enemies ==
=== Predators ===
Generalist species like birds, and mammals such as bears and raccoons, will eat larvae that lie along the forest floor. The stink bug is also a very common predator of hackberry emperor eggs.

=== Parasites ===
Scelionid egg parasites antagonize many species of Asterocampa, including the hackberry emperor. A tachinid fly parasitoid, Chetogena edwardsii, is another common threat to the hackberry emperor.

== Mating behavior ==
Male searching behavior in butterflies generally falls into two different strategies. One strategy is to actively patrol an area for females. Patrollers are attracted to still objects that resemble a mate. The other strategy is to perch. Perchers typically spend only part of the day actively looking for a mate. They sit perched upon a branch waiting for a female to fly by. When a male sees movement nearby it will quickly fly out to attempt to mate, but stay within a limited habitat.

A. celtis exhibit perching behavior. The male rests on rocks, trees, or fallen branches often along streams from the afternoon until around sundown.

== Conservation ==
The hackberry emperor is not under serious threat. It can commonly be found throughout most of its distribution.

== Gallery ==
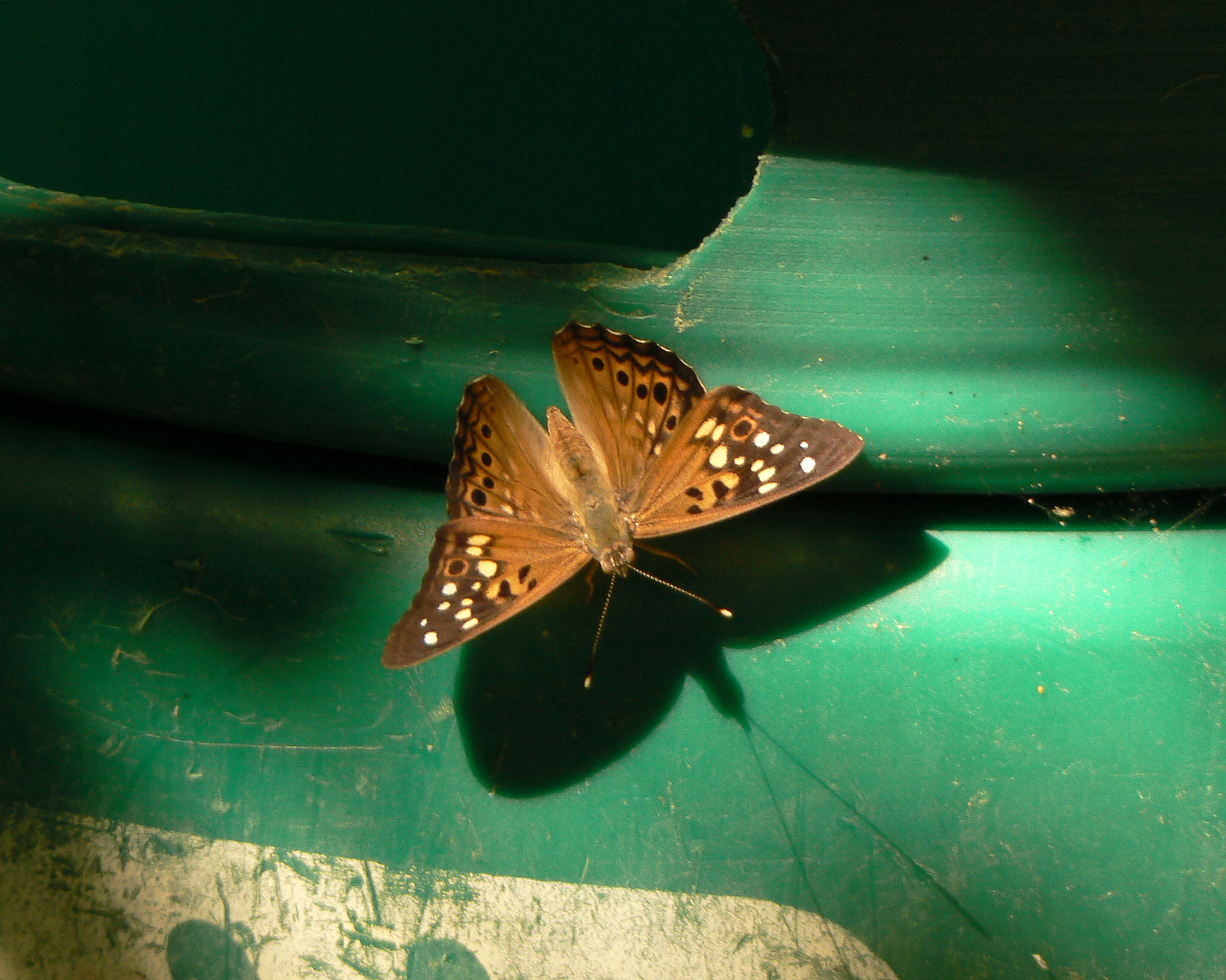

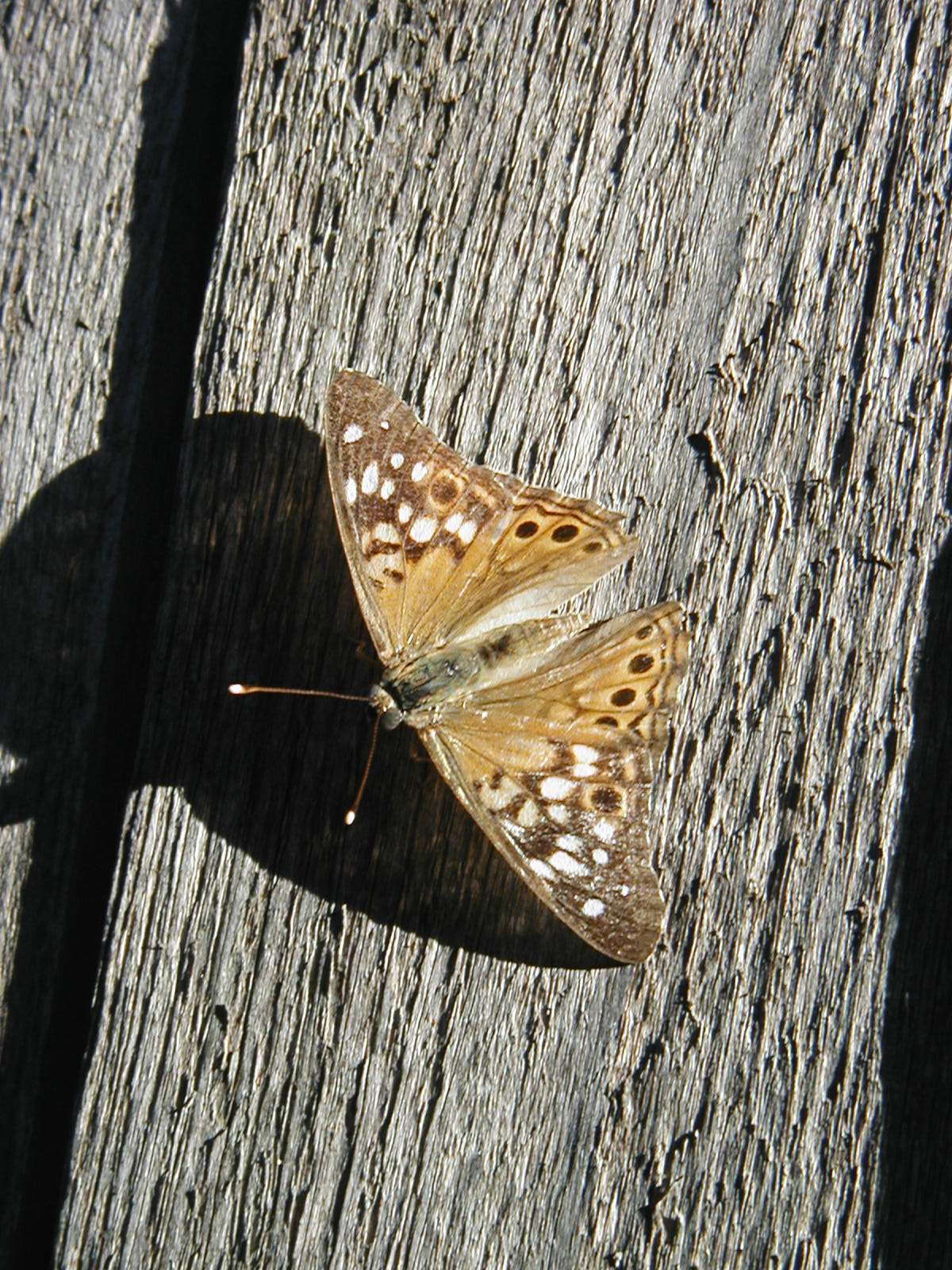
In Denton, Texas, United States

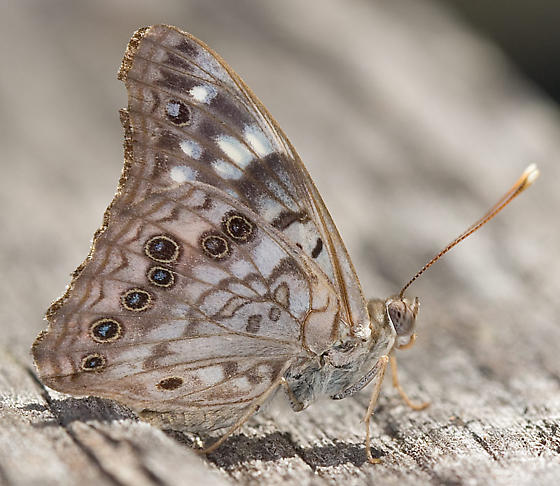

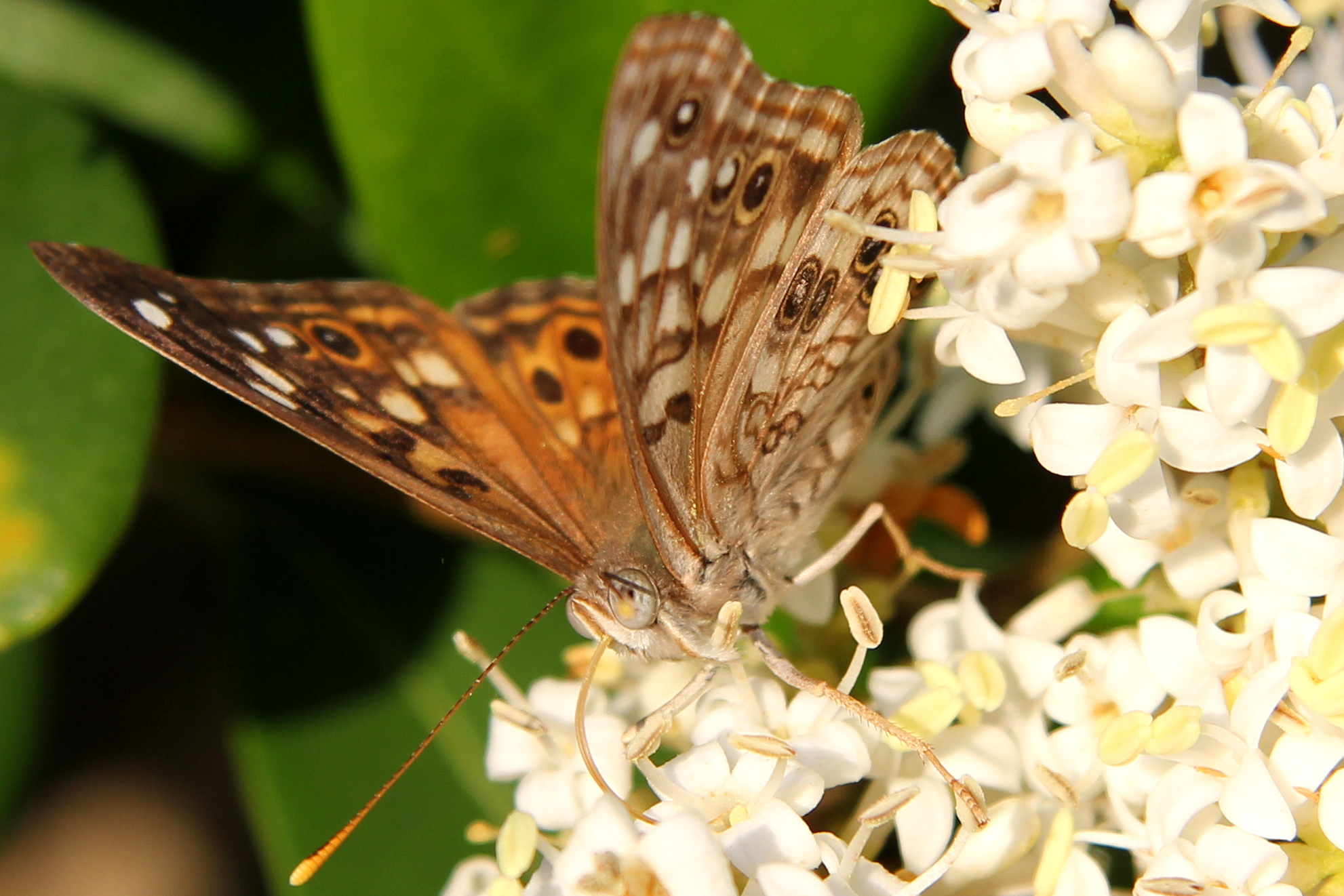
In Bastrop County, Texas

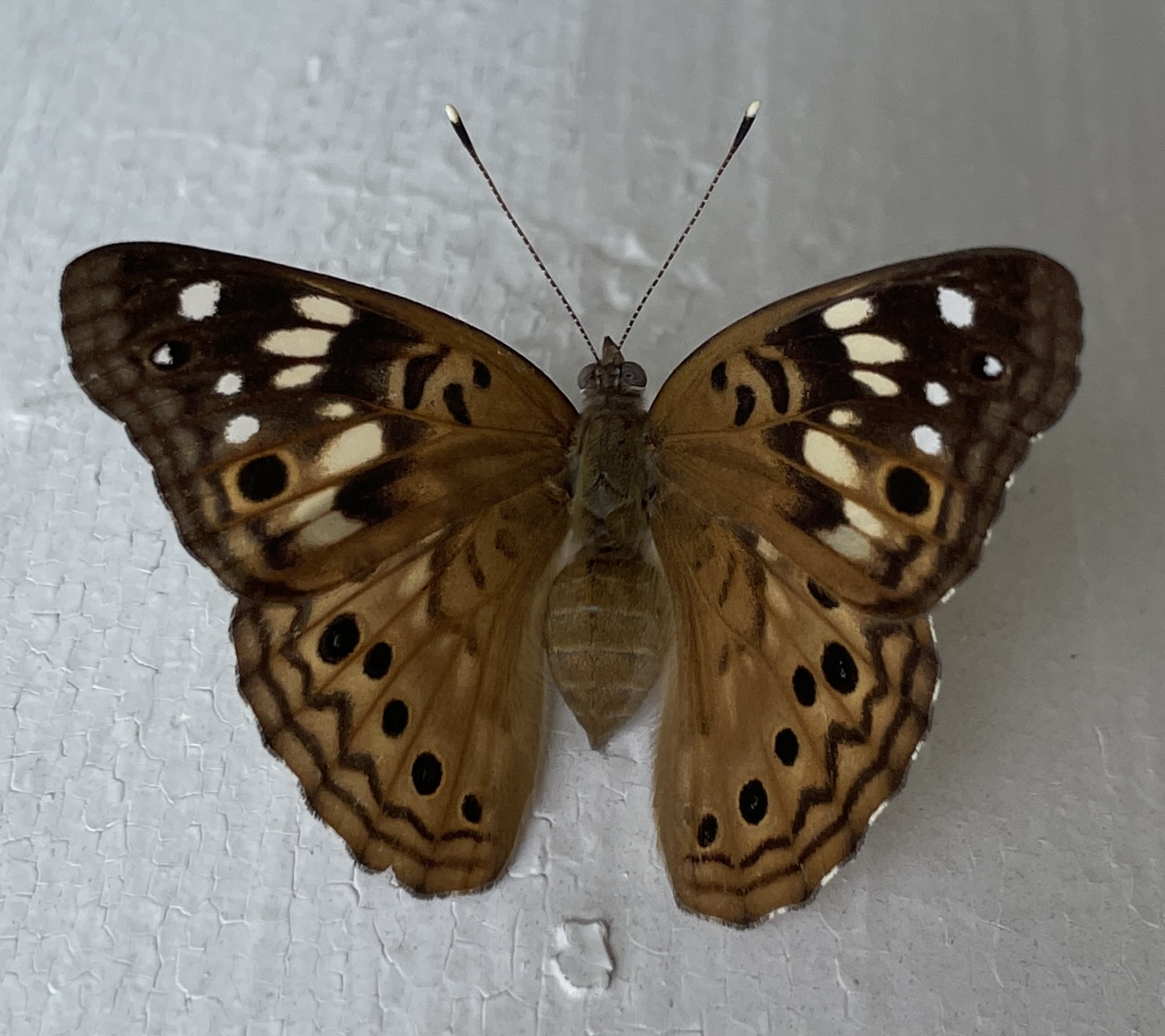
In Montgomery County, Alabama
