= Hackberry (Lavaca County), Texas =

Coordinates: 29.579°N 96.875°W

Hackberry is an unincorporated area that formerly held a distinct community in Lavaca County, Texas, United States. It is located along Farm to Market Road 532 (FM 532) eleven miles northeast of Hallettsville. Its origins began in 1846 when Ludwig Von Neuhaus came from Germany to settle in Texas. He arrived at the midway point on the train from Houston and San Antonio. The town was named for a grove of nearby hackberry trees. Neuhaus farmed the property for several years and in 1853 opened esteem sawmill-gristmill. He added a cotton gin several years later. The town acquired a post office in 1862. A Methodist church was built in 1861 and doubled as a school until it burnt down in 1896. Neuhaus in 1865 had a general store, which he later rebuilt in 1880 as a two-story store. The iron shutters may have been used as a protection against bandits or Indians in the area. Since the closure, the store has become a local reminder of the rich history of the area on FM 532 and been mostly ransacked by looters. Now the area is scattered with descendants of Neuhaus and other Central European immigrants. Farming mostly consists of cattle grazing and hay production.
