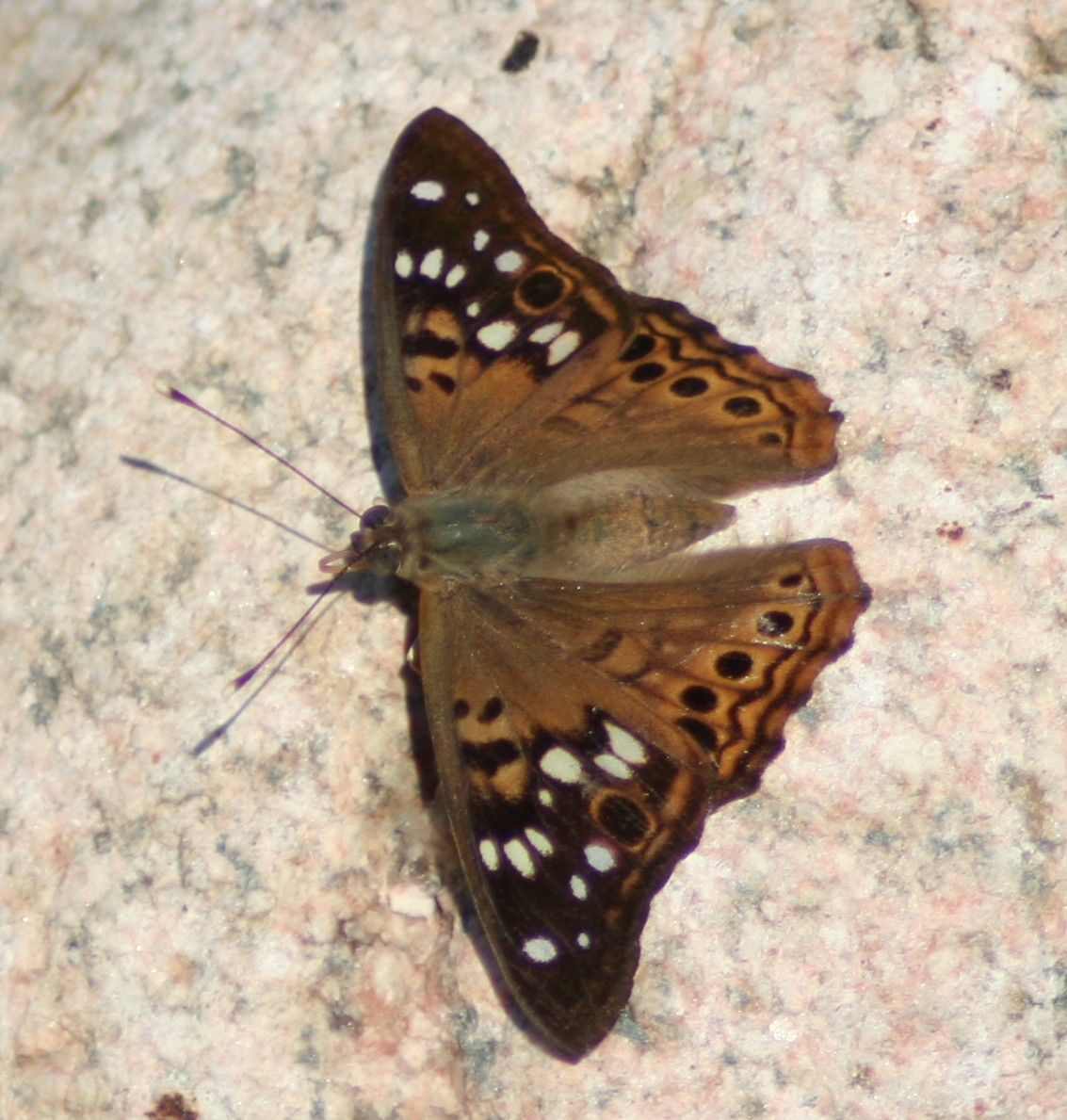
- Asterocampa celtis

Scientific classification
- Domain: Eukaryota
- Kingdom: Animalia
- Phylum: Arthropoda
- Class: Insecta
- Order: Lepidoptera
- Family: Nymphalidae
- Subfamily: Apaturinae
- Genus: Asterocampa; Röber, 1916

Species
- See text

= Asterocampa =

Genus of brush-footed butterflies

Asterocampa, commonly called hackberry butterflies or American emperors, is a genus of butterflies in the family Nymphalidae found mainly in North and Central America and the Caribbean.

== Species ==
The celtis species group:

- Asterocampa celtis (Boisduval & Le Conte, 1835) – hackberry emperor
- Asterocampa leilia (Edwards, 1874) – Empress Leilia or desert hackberry

The clyton species group:

- Asterocampa clyton (Boisduval & Le Conte, 1835) – tawny emperor
- Asterocampa idyja (Geyer, 1828) – dusky emperor
